This page lists all described species of the spider family Linyphiidae as of July 12, 2020, from I to P, of World Spider Catalog version 21.0

Ibadana
Ibadana Locket & Russell-Smith, 1980
 Ibadana cuspidata Locket & Russell-Smith, 1980 – Nigeria, Cameroon

Iberoneta
Iberoneta Deeleman-Reinhold, 1984
 Iberoneta nasewoa Deeleman-Reinhold, 1984 – Spain

Icariella
Icariella Brignoli, 1979
 Icariella hauseri Brignoli, 1979 – Greece

Idionella
Idionella Banks, 1893
 Idionella anomala (Gertsch & Ivie, 1936) – USA
 Idionella deserta (Gertsch & Ivie, 1936) – USA
 Idionella formosa (Banks, 1892) (type species) – USA
 Idionella formosa pista (Chamberlin, 1949) – USA
 Idionella nesiotes (Crosby, 1924) – USA
 Idionella rugosa (Crosby, 1905) – USA
 Idionella sclerata (Ivie & Barrows, 1935) – USA, Mexico
 Idionella titivillitium (Crosby & Bishop, 1925) – USA
 Idionella tugana (Chamberlin, 1949) – USA

Improphantes
Improphantes Saaristo & Tanasevitch, 1996
 Improphantes biconicus (Tanasevitch, 1992) – Russia, Japan
 Improphantes breviscapus Tanasevitch, 2013 – Israel
 Improphantes complicatus (Emerton, 1882) – Holarctic
 Improphantes contus Tanasevitch & Piterkina, 2007 – Kazakhstan
 Improphantes cypriot Tanasevitch, 2011 – Cyprus
 Improphantes decolor (Westring, 1861) – Europe, North Africa
 Improphantes djazairi (Bosmans, 1985) – Algeria
 Improphantes falcatus (Bosmans, 1979) – Kenya
 Improphantes flexilis (Tanasevitch, 1986) – Russia
 Improphantes furcabilis (Wunderlich, 1987) – Canary Islands
 Improphantes geniculatus (Kulczynski, 1898) – Europe, Russia
 Improphantes holmi (Kronestedt, 1975) – Sweden, Russia
 Improphantes huberti (Wunderlich, 1980) – Corsica
 Improphantes improbulus (Simon, 1929) (type species) – Palearctic
 Improphantes mauensis (Caporiacco, 1949) – Kenya
 Improphantes multidentatus (Wunderlich, 1987) – Canary Islands
 Improphantes nitidus (Thorell, 1875) – Europe
 Improphantes pamiricus (Tanasevitch, 1989) – Tajikistan
 Improphantes potanini (Tanasevitch, 1989) – Kyrgyzstan
 Improphantes turok Tanasevitch, 2011 – Turkey

Incestophantes
Incestophantes Tanasevitch, 1992
 Incestophantes altaicus Tanasevitch, 2000 – Russia
 Incestophantes amotus (Tanasevitch, 1990) – Russia, Georgia, Kazakhstan
 Incestophantes ancus Tanasevitch, 1996 – Russia
 Incestophantes annulatus (Kulczynski, 1882) – Eastern Europe
 Incestophantes bonus Tanasevitch, 1996 – Russia
 Incestophantes brevilamellus Tanasevitch, 2013 – Russia
 Incestophantes camtchadalicus (Tanasevitch, 1988) – Russia
 Incestophantes crucifer (Menge, 1866) – Palearctic
 Incestophantes cymbialis (Tanasevitch, 1988) – Russia
 Incestophantes duplicatus (Emerton, 1913) – USA, Canada, Alaska
 Incestophantes frigidus (Simon, 1884) – Europe
 Incestophantes incestoides (Tanasevitch & Eskov, 1987) – Russia
 Incestophantes incestus (L. Koch, 1879) (type species) – Russia, Mongolia
 Incestophantes khakassicus Tanasevitch, 1996 – Russia
 Incestophantes kochiellus (Strand, 1900) – Norway, Sweden, Finland, Russia, China
 Incestophantes kotulai (Kulczynski, 1905) – Central Europe
 Incestophantes lamprus (Chamberlin, 1920) – USA, Canada
 Incestophantes laricetorum (Tanasevitch & Eskov, 1987) – Russia
 Incestophantes logunovi Tanasevitch, 1996 – Russia
 Incestophantes mercedes (Chamberlin & Ivie, 1943) – USA
 Incestophantes shetekaurii Otto & Tanasevitch, 2015 
 Incestophantes tuvensis Tanasevitch, 1996 – Russia
 Incestophantes washingtoni (Zorsch, 1937) – USA, Canada

Indophantes
Indophantes Saaristo & Tanasevitch, 2003
 Indophantes agamus Tanasevitch & Saaristo, 2006 – Nepal
 Indophantes barat Saaristo & Tanasevitch, 2003 – Sumatra
 Indophantes bengalensis Saaristo & Tanasevitch, 2003 – India
 Indophantes digitulus (Thaler, 1987) – India, Nepal, Pakistan
 Indophantes halonatus (Li & Zhu, 1995) – China
 Indophantes kalimantanus Saaristo & Tanasevitch, 2003 (type species) – Borneo
 Indophantes kinabalu Saaristo & Tanasevitch, 2003 – Borneo
 Indophantes lehtineni Saaristo & Tanasevitch, 2003 – Borneo
 Indophantes pallidus Saaristo & Tanasevitch, 2003 – India
 Indophantes ramosus Tanasevitch, 2006 – China
 Indophantes sumatera Saaristo & Tanasevitch, 2003 – Sumatra
 Indophantes tonglu Tanasevitch, 2011 – India

Intecymbium
Intecymbium Miller, 2007
 Intecymbium antarcticum (Simon, 1895) – Chile, Argentina

Ipa
Ipa Saaristo, 2007
 Ipa keyserlingi (Ausserer, 1867) (type species) – Palearctic
 Ipa pepticus (Tanasevitch, 1988) – Kazakhstan, Turkmenistan, Mongolia
 Ipa spasskyi (Tanasevitch, 1986) – Turkey to Central Asia
 Ipa terrenus (L. Koch, 1879) – Europe, Russia

Ipaoides
Ipaoides Tanasevitch, 2008
 Ipaoides saaristoi Tanasevitch, 2008 – China

Islandiana
Islandiana Braendegaard, 1932
 Islandiana cavealis Ivie, 1965 – USA
 Islandiana coconino Ivie, 1965 – USA
 Islandiana cristata Eskov, 1987 – Russia, Alaska, Canada
 Islandiana falsifica (Keyserling, 1886) (type species) – Holarctic
 Islandiana flaveola (Banks, 1892) – USA, Canada
 Islandiana flavoides Ivie, 1965 – USA
 Islandiana holmi Ivie, 1965 – USA
 Islandiana lasalana (Chamberlin & Ivie, 1935) – USA
 Islandiana lewisi Milne & Wells, 2018 – USA
 Islandiana longisetosa (Emerton, 1882) – USA, Canada, Alaska
 Islandiana mimbres Ivie, 1965 – USA
 Islandiana muma Ivie, 1965 – USA
 Islandiana princeps Braendegaard, 1932 – USA, Canada, Greenland, Iceland
 Islandiana speophila Ivie, 1965 – USA
 Islandiana unicornis Ivie, 1965 – USA

Ivielum
Ivielum Eskov, 1988
 Ivielum sibiricum Eskov, 1988 – Russia, Mongolia, Canada

Jacksonella
Jacksonella Millidge, 1951
 Jacksonella bidens Tanasevitch, 2011 – Cyprus, Samos
 Jacksonella falconeri (Jackson, 1908) (type species) – Europe
 Jacksonella sexoculata Paik & Yaginuma, 1969 – Korea

Jalapyphantes
Jalapyphantes Gertsch & Davis, 1946
 Jalapyphantes cuernavaca Gertsch & Davis, 1946 (type species) – Mexico
 Jalapyphantes minoratus Gertsch & Davis, 1946 – Mexico
 Jalapyphantes obscurus Millidge, 1991 – Ecuador
 Jalapyphantes puebla Gertsch & Davis, 1946 – Mexico

Janetschekia
Janetschekia Schenkel, 1939
 Janetschekia monodon (O. P.-Cambridge, 1872) (type species) – Switzerland, Germany, Austria, Italy
 Janetschekia necessaria Tanasevitch, 1985 – Central Asia

Javagone
Javagone Tanasevitch, 2020
 Javagone maribaya Tanasevitch, 2020 – Java

Javanaria
Javanaria Tanasevitch, 2020
 Javanaria gracilipes Tanasevitch, 2020 – Java

Javanyphia
Javanyphia Tanasevitch, 2020
 Javanyphia gede Tanasevitch, 2020 – Java

Johorea
Johorea Locket, 1982
 Johorea decorata Locket, 1982 – Malaysia

Juanfernandezia
Juanfernandezia Kocak & Kemal, 2008
 Juanfernandezia melanocephala (Millidge, 1991) – Juan Fernandez Islands

Kaestneria
Kaestneria Wiehle, 1956
 Kaestneria bicultrata Chen & Yin, 2000 – China
 Kaestneria dorsalis (Wider, 1834) (type species) – Palearctic
 Kaestneria longissima (Zhu & Wen, 1983) – Russia, China
 Kaestneria minima Locket, 1982 – Malaysia
 Kaestneria pullata (O. P.-Cambridge, 1863) – Holarctic
 Kaestneria rufula (Hackman, 1954) – USA, Canada
 Kaestneria torrentum (Kulczynski, 1882) – Eastern Europe
 Kaestneria valentissima Irfan & Peng, 2018 – China

Kagurargus
Kagurargus Ono, 2007
 Kagurargus kikuyai Ono, 2007 – Japan

Kalimagone 
Kalimagone Tanasevitch, 2017
 Kalimagone cuspidata Tanasevitch, 2017  (type species) −  Malaysia (Borneo) 
 Kalimagone rotunda Tanasevitch, 2017 −  Malaysia (Borneo)

Karita
Karita Tanasevitch, 2007
 Karita paludosa (Duffey, 1971) – Ireland, Britain, Belgium, Germany, Russia

Kenocymbium
Kenocymbium Millidge & Russell-Smith, 1992
 Kenocymbium deelemanae Millidge & Russell-Smith, 1992 (type species) – Sumatra
 Kenocymbium simile Millidge & Russell-Smith, 1992 – Thailand

Ketambea
Ketambea Millidge & Russell-Smith, 1992
 Ketambea acuta Tanasevitch, 2017 − Myanmar, Thailand
 Ketambea liupanensis (Tang & Song, 1992) − Russia (Far East), China
 Ketambea nigripectoris (Oi, 1960) − Russia (Far East), China, Korea, Japan
 Ketambea permixta Millidge & Russell-Smith, 1992 – Java
 Ketambea rostrata Millidge & Russell-Smith, 1992 (type species) – Sumatra
 Ketambea vermiformis Millidge & Russell-Smith, 1992 – Java

Kikimora
Kikimora Eskov, 1988
 Kikimora palustris Eskov, 1988 – Finland, Russia

Knischatiria
Knischatiria Wunderlich, 1976
 Knischatiria abnormis Wunderlich, 1976 (type species) – Queensland
 Knischatiria longispina Wunderlich, 1995 – Sumatra
 Knischatiria tuberosa Wunderlich, 1995 – Malaysia

Koinothrix
Koinothrix Jocque, 1981
 Koinothrix pequenops Jocque, 1981 – Cape Verde Islands

Kolymocyba
Kolymocyba Eskov, 1989
 Kolymocyba petrophila Eskov, 1989 – Russia

Kratochviliella
Kratochviliella Miller, 1938
 Kratochviliella bicapitata Miller, 1938 – Europe

Labicymbium
Labicymbium Millidge, 1991
 Labicymbium ambiguum Millidge, 1991 – Colombia
 Labicymbium auctum Millidge, 1991 – Colombia
 Labicymbium avium Millidge, 1991 – Ecuador
 Labicymbium breve Millidge, 1991 – Colombia
 Labicymbium cognatum Millidge, 1991 – Peru
 Labicymbium cordiforme Millidge, 1991 – Colombia
 Labicymbium curitiba Rodrigues, 2008 – Brazil
 Labicymbium dentichele Millidge, 1991 – Peru
 Labicymbium exiguum Millidge, 1991 – Colombia
 Labicymbium fuscum Millidge, 1991 – Colombia
 Labicymbium jucundum Millidge, 1991 – Colombia
 Labicymbium majus Millidge, 1991 – Colombia
 Labicymbium montanum Millidge, 1991 – Venezuela
 Labicymbium nigrum Millidge, 1991 – Colombia
 Labicymbium opacum Millidge, 1991 – Colombia
 Labicymbium otti Rodrigues, 2008 – Brazil
 Labicymbium rancho Ott & Lise, 1997 – Brazil
 Labicymbium rusticulum (Keyserling, 1891) – Brazil
 Labicymbium sturmi Millidge, 1991 (type species) – Colombia
 Labicymbium sublestum Millidge, 1991 – Colombia, Ecuador

Labulla
Labulla Simon, 1884
 Labulla flahaulti Simon, 1914 – France, Spain
 Labulla machadoi Hormiga & Scharff, 2005 – Portugal
 Labulla thoracica (Wider, 1834) (type species) – Europe, Russia

Labullinyphia
Labullinyphia van Helsdingen, 1985
 Labullinyphia furcata Irfan & Peng, 2019 – China
 Labullinyphia tersa (Simon, 1894) – Sri Lanka

Labullula
Labullula Strand, 1913
 Labullula annulipes Strand, 1913 – Cameroon, Central Africa, Angola, Comoro Islands

Laetesia
Laetesia Simon, 1908
 Laetesia amoena Millidge, 1988 – New Zealand
 Laetesia asiatica Millidge, 1995 – Thailand
 Laetesia aucklandensis (Forster, 1964) – Auckland Islands
 Laetesia bellissima Millidge, 1988 – New Zealand
 Laetesia chathami Millidge, 1988 – New Zealand
 Laetesia distincta Millidge, 1988 – New Zealand
 Laetesia egregia Simon, 1908 – Western Australia
 Laetesia forsteri Wunderlich, 1976 – New South Wales
 Laetesia germana Millidge, 1988 – New Zealand
 Laetesia intermedia Blest & Vink, 2003 – New Zealand
 Laetesia leo van Helsdingen, 1972 – South Australia
 Laetesia minor Millidge, 1988 – New Zealand
 Laetesia mollita Simon, 1908 (type species) – Western Australia
 Laetesia nornalupiensis Wunderlich, 1976 – Western Australia
 Laetesia oceaniae (Berland, 1938) – New Hebrides
 Laetesia olvidada Blest & Vink, 2003 – New Zealand
 Laetesia paragermana Blest & Vink, 2003 – New Zealand
 Laetesia peramoena (O. P.-Cambridge, 1879) – New Zealand
 Laetesia prominens Millidge, 1988 – New Zealand
 Laetesia pseudamoena Blest & Vink, 2003 – New Zealand
 Laetesia pulcherrima Blest & Vink, 2003 – New Zealand
 Laetesia raveni Hormiga & Scharff, 2014 - Queensland, New South Wales 
 Laetesia trispathulata (Urquhart, 1886) – New Zealand
 Laetesia weburdi (Urquhart, 1890) – New South Wales
 Laetesia woomeraensis Wunderlich, 1976 – South Australia

Lamellasia
Lamellasia Tanasevitch, 2014
 Lamellasia mirabilis Tanasevitch, 2014 – Thailand

Laminacauda
Laminacauda Millidge, 1985
 Laminacauda aluminensis Millidge, 1991 – Argentina
 Laminacauda amabilis (Keyserling, 1886) – Peru
 Laminacauda ansoni Millidge, 1991 – Juan Fernandez Islands
 Laminacauda argentinensis Millidge, 1985 – Argentina
 Laminacauda baerti Miller, 2007 – Panama, Colombia, Galapagos Islands
 Laminacauda boliviensis Millidge, 1985 – Bolivia
 Laminacauda cognata Millidge, 1991 – Juan Fernandez Islands
 Laminacauda defoei (F. O. P.-Cambridge, 1899) – Juan Fernandez Islands
 Laminacauda dentichelis (Berland, 1913) – Ecuador
 Laminacauda diffusa Millidge, 1985 (type species) – Chile, Argentina, Falkland Islands
 Laminacauda dysphorica (Keyserling, 1886) – Peru, Bolivia
 Laminacauda expers Millidge, 1991 – Peru
 Laminacauda fuegiana (Tullgren, 1901) – Chile, Falkland Islands
 Laminacauda gigas Millidge, 1991 – Juan Fernandez Islands
 Laminacauda grata Millidge, 1991 – Colombia
 Laminacauda insulana Millidge, 1985 – Tristan da Cunha
 Laminacauda luscinia Millidge, 1985 – Tristan da Cunha
 Laminacauda magna Millidge, 1991 – Juan Fernandez Islands
 Laminacauda malkini Millidge, 1991 – Juan Fernandez Islands
 Laminacauda maxima Millidge, 1985 – Tristan da Cunha
 Laminacauda montevidensis (Keyserling, 1878) – Brazil, Uruguay, Argentina
 Laminacauda monticola Millidge, 1985 – Bolivia
 Laminacauda nana Millidge, 1991 – Chile
 Laminacauda newtoni Millidge, 1985 – Chile, Argentina
 Laminacauda orina (Chamberlin, 1916) – Peru
 Laminacauda pacifica (Berland, 1924) – Juan Fernandez Islands
 Laminacauda parvipalpis Millidge, 1985 – Chile
 Laminacauda peruensis Millidge, 1985 – Peru
 Laminacauda plagiata (Tullgren, 1901) – Chile, Argentina, Falkland Islands
 Laminacauda propinqua Millidge, 1991 – Juan Fernandez Islands
 Laminacauda rubens Millidge, 1991 – Juan Fernandez Islands
 Laminacauda sacra Millidge, 1991 – Bolivia
 Laminacauda salsa Millidge, 1991 – Chile
 Laminacauda suavis Millidge, 1991 – Colombia
 Laminacauda sublimis Millidge, 1991 – Peru
 Laminacauda thayerae Millidge, 1985 – Chile
 Laminacauda tristani Millidge, 1985 – Tristan da Cunha
 Laminacauda tuberosa Millidge, 1991 – Juan Fernandez Islands
 Laminacauda tucumani Millidge, 1991 – Argentina
 Laminacauda vicana (Keyserling, 1886) – Peru
 Laminacauda villagra Millidge, 1991 – Juan Fernandez Islands

Laminafroneta
Laminafroneta Merrett, 2004
 Laminafroneta bidentata (Holm, 1968) (type species) – Congo, Kenya, Rwanda
 Laminafroneta brevistyla (Holm, 1968) – Cameroon, Congo, Kenya, Tanzania
 Laminafroneta locketi (Merrett & Russell-Smith, 1996) – Ethiopia

Laperousea
Laperousea Dalmas, 1917
 Laperousea blattifera (Urquhart, 1887) (type species) – Australia, New Zealand
 Laperousea quindecimpunctata (Urquhart, 1893) – Tasmania

Lasiargus
Lasiargus Kulczynski, 1894
 Lasiargus hirsutoides Wunderlich, 1995 – Mongolia
 Lasiargus hirsutus (Menge, 1869) (type species) – Palearctic
 Lasiargus pilipes (Kulczynski, 1908) – Russia, Kazakhstan
 Lasiargus zhui Eskov & Marusik, 1994 – Russia

Lepthyphantes
Lepthyphantes Menge, 1866
 Lepthyphantes abditus Tanasevitch, 1986 – Russia
 Lepthyphantes aberdarensis Russell-Smith & Jocque, 1986 – Kenya
 Lepthyphantes acuminifrons Bosmans, 1978 – Ethiopia
 Lepthyphantes aegeus Caporiacco, 1948 – Greece
 Lepthyphantes aelleni Denis, 1957 – Morocco
 Lepthyphantes afer (Simon, 1913) – Algeria
 Lepthyphantes ajoti Bosmans, 1991 – Algeria
 Lepthyphantes albimaculatus (O. P.-Cambridge, 1873) – St. Helena
 Lepthyphantes albuloides (O. P.-Cambridge, 1872) – Cyprus, Israel
 Lepthyphantes aldersoni Levi & Levi, 1955 – Canada
 Lepthyphantes allegrii Caporiacco, 1935 – Karakorum
 Lepthyphantes almoravidus Barrientos, 2020 – Morocco
 Lepthyphantes alpinus (Emerton, 1882) – Holarctic
 Lepthyphantes altissimus Hu, 2001 – China
 Lepthyphantes annulipes Caporiacco, 1935 – Karakorum
 Lepthyphantes arcticus (Keyserling, 1886) – Alaska
 Lepthyphantes badhkyzensis Tanasevitch, 1986 – Turkmenistan
 Lepthyphantes bakeri Scharff, 1990 – Tanzania
 Lepthyphantes balearicus Denis, 1961 – Balearic Islands
 Lepthyphantes bamboutensis Bosmans, 1986 – Cameroon
 Lepthyphantes bamilekei Bosmans, 1986 – Cameroon
 Lepthyphantes beroni Deltshev, 1979 – Greece
 Lepthyphantes beshkovi Deltshev, 1979 – Crete
 Lepthyphantes bhudbari Tikader, 1970 – India
 Lepthyphantes bidentatus Hormiga & Ribera, 1990 – Spain
 Lepthyphantes biospeleologorum Barrientos, 2020 – Morocco
 Lepthyphantes biseriatus Simon & Fage, 1922 – Kenya
 Lepthyphantes biseriatus infans Simon & Fage, 1922 – East Africa
 Lepthyphantes bituberculatus Bosmans, 1978 – Ethiopia
 Lepthyphantes brevihamatus Bosmans, 1985 – Morocco
 Lepthyphantes brignolianus Deltshev, 1979 – Crete
 Lepthyphantes buensis Bosmans & Jocque, 1983 – Cameroon
 Lepthyphantes carlittensis Denis, 1952 – France
 Lepthyphantes cavernicola Paik & Yaginuma, 1969 – Korea
 Lepthyphantes centromeroides Kulczynski, 1914 – Balkans, Bulgaria, Romania
 Lepthyphantes centromeroides carpaticus Dumitrescu & Georgescu, 1970 – Romania
 Lepthyphantes chamberlini Schenkel, 1950 – USA, Canada
 Lepthyphantes chita Scharff, 1990 – Tanzania
 Lepthyphantes christodeltshev van Helsdingen, 2009 – Greece
 Lepthyphantes concavus (Oi, 1960) – Japan
 Lepthyphantes constantinescui Georgescu, 1989 – Romania
 Lepthyphantes coomansi Bosmans, 1979 – Kenya
 Lepthyphantes cruciformis Tanasevitch, 1989 – Kyrgyzstan
 Lepthyphantes cruentatus Tanasevitch, 1987 – Russia, Georgia
 Lepthyphantes cultellifer Schenkel, 1936 – China
 Lepthyphantes deosaicola Caporiacco, 1935 – Karakorum
 Lepthyphantes dilutus (Thorell, 1875) – Sweden
 Lepthyphantes dolichoskeles Scharff, 1990 – Tanzania
 Lepthyphantes emarginatus Fage, 1931 – Algeria
 Lepthyphantes encaustus (Becker, 1879) – Moldavia
 Lepthyphantes ensifer Barrientos, 2020 – Morocco
 Lepthyphantes erigonoides Schenkel, 1936 – China
 Lepthyphantes escapus Tanasevitch, 1989 – Turkmenistan
 Lepthyphantes exvaginatus Deeleman-Reinhold, 1984 – Algeria
 Lepthyphantes fadriquei Barrientos, 2020 – Morocco
 Lepthyphantes fernandezi Berland, 1924 – Juan Fernandez Islands
 Lepthyphantes furcillifer Chamberlin & Ivie, 1933 – USA
 Lepthyphantes gadesi Fage, 1931 – Spain
 Lepthyphantes hamifer Simon, 1884 – Palearctic
 Lepthyphantes hirsutus Tanasevitch, 1988 – Russia
 Lepthyphantes hissaricus Tanasevitch, 1989 – Tajikistan
 Lepthyphantes howelli Jocque & Scharff, 1986 – Tanzania
 Lepthyphantes huberti Wunderlich, 1980 – Corsica
 Lepthyphantes hublei Bosmans, 1986 – Cameroon
 Lepthyphantes hummeli Schenkel, 1936 – China
 Lepthyphantes hunanensis Yin, 2012 – China
 Lepthyphantes ibericus Ribera, 1981 – Spain
 Lepthyphantes imazigheni Barrientos, 2020 – Morocco
 Lepthyphantes impudicus Kulczynski, 1909 – Madeira
 Lepthyphantes incertissimus Caporiacco, 1935 – Karakorum
 Lepthyphantes inopinatus Locket, 1968 – Congo
 Lepthyphantes intricatus (Emerton, 1911) – USA, Canada
 Lepthyphantes iranicus Saaristo & Tanasevitch, 1996 – Iran
 Lepthyphantes japonicus Oi, 1960 – Japan
 Lepthyphantes kansuensis Schenkel, 1936 – China
 Lepthyphantes kekenboschi Bosmans, 1979 – Kenya
 Lepthyphantes kenyensis Bosmans, 1979 – Kenya
 Lepthyphantes kilimandjaricus Tullgren, 1910 – Tanzania
 Lepthyphantes kolymensis Tanasevitch & Eskov, 1987 – Russia
 Lepthyphantes kratochvili Fage, 1945 – Crete
 Lepthyphantes lamellatus Barrientos, 2020 – Morocco
 Lepthyphantes latrobei Millidge, 1995 – Krakatau
 Lepthyphantes latus Paik, 1965 – Korea
 Lepthyphantes lebronneci Berland, 1935 – Marquesas Islands
 Lepthyphantes leknizii Barrientos, 2020 – Morocco
 Lepthyphantes leprosus (Ohlert, 1865) – Holarctic, Chile
 Lepthyphantes leucocerus Locket, 1968 – Angola
 Lepthyphantes leucopygius Denis, 1939 – France
 Lepthyphantes ligulifer Denis, 1952 – Romania
 Lepthyphantes lingsoka Tikader, 1970 – India
 Lepthyphantes linzhiensis Hu, 2001 – China
 Lepthyphantes locketi van Helsdingen, 1977 – Angola, Kenya
 Lepthyphantes longihamatus Bosmans, 1985 – Morocco
 Lepthyphantes longipedis Tanasevitch, 2014 − Morocco 
 Lepthyphantes louettei Jocque, 1985 – Comoro Islands
 Lepthyphantes lundbladi Schenkel, 1938 – Madeira
 Lepthyphantes luteipes (L. Koch, 1879) – Russia, Kazakhstan, Mongolia, China, Japan
 Lepthyphantes maculatus (Banks, 1900) – USA
 Lepthyphantes maesi Bosmans, 1986 – Cameroon
 Lepthyphantes magnesiae Brignoli, 1979 – Greece
 Lepthyphantes manengoubensis Bosmans, 1986 – Cameroon
 Lepthyphantes mauli Wunderlich, 1992 – Madeira
 Lepthyphantes maurusius Brignoli, 1978 – Morocco
 Lepthyphantes mbaboensis Bosmans, 1986 – Cameroon
 Lepthyphantes meillonae Denis, 1953 – France
 Lepthyphantes messapicus Caporiacco, 1939 – Italy
 Lepthyphantes micromegethes Locket, 1968 – Angola
 Lepthyphantes microserratus Petrunkevitch, 1930 – Puerto Rico
 Lepthyphantes minusculus Locket, 1968 – Congo
 Lepthyphantes minutus (Blackwall, 1833) (type species) – Holarctic
 Lepthyphantes msuyai Scharff, 1990 – Tanzania
 Lepthyphantes natalis Bosmans, 1986 – Cameroon
 Lepthyphantes nenilini Tanasevitch, 1988 – Russia
 Lepthyphantes neocaledonicus Berland, 1924 – New Caledonia
 Lepthyphantes nigridorsus Caporiacco, 1935 – Karakorum
 Lepthyphantes nigropictus Bosmans, 1979 – Kenya
 Lepthyphantes nitidior Simon, 1929 – France
 Lepthyphantes nodifer Simon, 1884 – Europe
 Lepthyphantes noronhensis Rodrigues, Brescovit & Freitas, 2008 – Brazil
 Lepthyphantes notabilis Kulczynski, 1887 – Central Europe
 Lepthyphantes obtusicornis Bosmans, 1979 – Kenya
 Lepthyphantes okuensis Bosmans, 1986 – Cameroon
 Lepthyphantes opilio Simon, 1929 – France
 Lepthyphantes palmeroensis Wunderlich, 1992 – Canary Islands
 Lepthyphantes patulus Locket, 1968 – Angola
 Lepthyphantes pennatus Scharff, 1990 – Tanzania
 Lepthyphantes peramplus (O. Pickard-Cambridge, 1885) − India 
 Lepthyphantes perfidus Tanasevitch, 1985 – Central Asia
 Lepthyphantes phallifer Fage, 1931 – Spain
 Lepthyphantes phialoides Scharff, 1990 – Tanzania
 Lepthyphantes pieltaini Machado, 1940 – Morocco
 Lepthyphantes pratorum Caporiacco, 1935 – Karakorum
 Lepthyphantes rainieri Emerton, 1926 – Canada
 Lepthyphantes rimicola Lawrence, 1964 – South Africa
 Lepthyphantes rossitsae Dimitrov, 2018 – Turkey
 Lepthyphantes rubescens Emerton, 1926 – Canada
 Lepthyphantes rudrai Tikader, 1970 – India
 Lepthyphantes ruwenzori Jocque, 1985 – Congo, Uganda
 Lepthyphantes sardous Gozo, 1908 – Sardinia
 Lepthyphantes sasi Barrientos, 2020 – Morocco
 Lepthyphantes saurensis Eskov, 1995 – Kazakhstan
 Lepthyphantes serratus Oi, 1960 – Japan
 Lepthyphantes silvamontanus Bosmans & Jocque, 1983 – Cameroon
 Lepthyphantes simiensis Bosmans, 1978 – Ethiopia
 Lepthyphantes speculae Denis, 1959 – Lebanon
 Lepthyphantes stramineus (O. Pickard-Cambridge, 1885) − India 
 Lepthyphantes striatiformis Caporiacco, 1934 – Karakorum
 Lepthyphantes strinatii Hubert, 1970 – Tunisia
 Lepthyphantes styx Wunderlich, 2011 – Canary Islands
 Lepthyphantes subtilis Tanasevitch, 1989 – Kyrgyzstan
 Lepthyphantes tamara Chamberlin & Ivie, 1943 – USA
 Lepthyphantes taza Tanasevitch, 2014 − Morocco 
 Lepthyphantes todillus Simon, 1929 – France
 Lepthyphantes trivittatus Caporiacco, 1935 – Karakorum
 Lepthyphantes tropicalis Tullgren, 1910 – Tanzania
 Lepthyphantes tullgreni Bosmans, 1978 – Tanzania
 Lepthyphantes turanicus Tanasevitch & Fet, 1986 – Turkmenistan
 Lepthyphantes turbatrix (O. P.-Cambridge, 1877) – North America, Greenland
 Lepthyphantes ultimus Tanasevitch, 1989 – Tajikistan
 Lepthyphantes umbratilis (Keyserling, 1886) – USA
 Lepthyphantes vanstallei Bosmans, 1986 – Cameroon
 Lepthyphantes venereus Simon, 1913 – Algeria
 Lepthyphantes vividus Denis, 1955 – Lebanon
 Lepthyphantes yueluensis Yin, 2012 – China
 Lepthyphantes yushuensis Hu, 2001 – China
 Lepthyphantes zhangmuensis Hu, 2001 – China

Leptorhoptrum
Leptorhoptrum Kulczynski, 1894
 Leptorhoptrum robustum (Westring, 1851) – Holarctic

Leptothrix
Leptothrix Menge, 1869
 Leptothrix hardyi (Blackwall, 1850) – Palearctic

Lessertia
Lessertia Smith, 1908
 Lessertia barbara (Simon, 1884) – Spain, Morocco, Algeria
 Lessertia dentichelis (Simon, 1884) (type species) – Europe, Canary Islands, Madeira, Canada, New Zealand

Lessertinella
Lessertinella Denis, 1947
 Lessertinella carpatica Weiss, 1979 – Slovakia, Romania
 Lessertinella kulczynskii (Lessert, 1910) (type species) – Switzerland, Germany, Austria, Slovakia, Italy

Lidia
Lidia Saaristo & Marusik, 2004
 Lidia molesta (Tanasevitch, 1989) – Kyrgyzstan
 Lidia tarabaevi Saaristo & Marusik, 2004 (type species) – Kazakhstan

Limoneta
Limoneta Bosmans & Jocque, 1983
 Limoneta graminicola Bosmans & Jocque, 1983 (type species) – Cameroon
 Limoneta sirimoni (Bosmans, 1979) – Kenya, South Africa

Linyphantes
Linyphantes Chamberlin & Ivie, 1942
 Linyphantes aeronauticus (Petrunkevitch, 1929) (type species) – USA
 Linyphantes aliso Chamberlin & Ivie, 1942 – USA
 Linyphantes anacortes Chamberlin & Ivie, 1942 – USA
 Linyphantes delmarus Chamberlin & Ivie, 1942 – USA
 Linyphantes distinctus Chamberlin & Ivie, 1942 – USA
 Linyphantes eureka Chamberlin & Ivie, 1942 – USA
 Linyphantes laguna Chamberlin & Ivie, 1942 – USA
 Linyphantes microps Chamberlin & Ivie, 1942 – USA
 Linyphantes natches Chamberlin & Ivie, 1942 – USA
 Linyphantes nehalem Chamberlin & Ivie, 1942 – USA
 Linyphantes nigrescens Chamberlin & Ivie, 1942 – USA
 Linyphantes obscurus Chamberlin & Ivie, 1942 – USA
 Linyphantes orcinus (Emerton, 1917) – USA, Canada
 Linyphantes pacificus (Banks, 1906) – USA
 Linyphantes pacificus Chamberlin & Ivie, 1942 – USA
 Linyphantes pualla Chamberlin & Ivie, 1942 – USA, Canada
 Linyphantes santinez Chamberlin & Ivie, 1942 – USA
 Linyphantes santinez verdugo Chamberlin & Ivie, 1942 – USA
 Linyphantes tragicus (Banks, 1898) – Mexico
 Linyphantes victoria Chamberlin & Ivie, 1942 – Canada

Linyphia
Linyphia Latreille, 1804
 Linyphia adstricta (Keyserling, 1886) – USA
 Linyphia albipunctata O. P.-Cambridge, 1885 – Yarkand
 Linyphia alpicola van Helsdingen, 1969 – Central Europe
 Linyphia armata (Keyserling, 1891) – Brazil
 Linyphia bicuspis (F. O. P.-Cambridge, 1902) – Mexico
 Linyphia bifasciata (F. O. P.-Cambridge, 1902) – Costa Rica
 Linyphia bisignata (Banks, 1909) – Costa Rica
 Linyphia calcarifera (Keyserling, 1886) – Panama, Colombia
 Linyphia catalina Gertsch, 1951 – USA
 Linyphia chiapasia Gertsch & Davis, 1946 – Mexico
 Linyphia chiridota (Thorell, 1895) – Myanmar
 Linyphia clara (Keyserling, 1891) – Brazil
 Linyphia confinis O. P.-Cambridge, 1902 – Guatemala
 Linyphia consanguinea O. P.-Cambridge, 1885 – Yarkand
 Linyphia cylindrata (Keyserling, 1891) – Brazil
 Linyphia decorata (Keyserling, 1891) – Brazil
 Linyphia duplicata (F. O. P.-Cambridge, 1902) – Mexico, Guatemala
 Linyphia eiseni Banks, 1898 – Mexico
 Linyphia emertoni Thorell, 1875 – Canada
 Linyphia falculifera (F. O. P.-Cambridge, 1902) – Costa Rica
 Linyphia ferentaria (Keyserling, 1886) – Peru
 Linyphia horaea (Keyserling, 1886) – Colombia
 Linyphia hortensis Sundevall, 1830 – Palearctic
 Linyphia hospita (Keyserling, 1886) – Colombia
 Linyphia hui Hu, 2001 – China
 Linyphia karschi Roewer, 1942 – Sao Tome
 Linyphia lambda (F. O. P.-Cambridge, 1902) – Guatemala
 Linyphia lehmanni Simon, 1903 – Argentina
 Linyphia leucosternon White, 1841 – Brazil
 Linyphia limatula Simon, 1904 – Chile
 Linyphia limbata (F. O. P.-Cambridge, 1902) – Mexico, Guatemala
 Linyphia lineola Pavesi, 1883 – Ethiopia
 Linyphia linguatula (F. O. P.-Cambridge, 1902) – Guatemala
 Linyphia linzhiensis Hu, 2001 – China
 Linyphia longiceps (Keyserling, 1891) – Brazil
 Linyphia longispina (F. O. P.-Cambridge, 1902) – Mexico
 Linyphia ludibunda (Keyserling, 1886) – Peru
 Linyphia lurida (Keyserling, 1886) – Colombia
 Linyphia maculosa (Banks, 1909) – Costa Rica
 Linyphia maura Thorell, 1875 – Western Mediterranean
 Linyphia melanoprocta Mello-Leitao, 1944 – Argentina
 Linyphia menyuanensis Hu, 2001 – China
 Linyphia mimonti Simon, 1884 – Italy, Greece, Lebanon, Israel
 Linyphia monticolens Roewer, 1942 – Peru
 Linyphia neophita Hentz, 1850 – USA
 Linyphia nepalensis Wunderlich, 1983 – Nepal
 Linyphia nigrita (F. O. P.-Cambridge, 1902) – Mexico, Guatemala
 Linyphia nitens Urquhart, 1893 – Tasmania
 Linyphia obesa Thorell, 1875 – Sweden
 Linyphia obscurella Roewer, 1942 – Brazil
 Linyphia octopunctata (Chamberlin & Ivie, 1936) – Panama
 Linyphia oligochronia (Keyserling, 1886) – Peru
 Linyphia orophila Thorell, 1877 – USA
 Linyphia peruana (Keyserling, 1886) – Peru
 Linyphia petrunkevitchi Roewer, 1942 – Guatemala
 Linyphia phaeochorda Rainbow, 1920 – Norfolk Islands
 Linyphia phyllophora Thorell, 1890 – Sumatra
 Linyphia polita Blackwall, 1870 – Sicily
 Linyphia postica (Banks, 1909) – Costa Rica
 Linyphia rita Gertsch, 1951 – USA
 Linyphia rubella Keyserling, 1886 – Peru
 Linyphia rubriceps (Keyserling, 1891) – Brazil
 Linyphia rustica (F. O. P.-Cambridge, 1902) – Mexico
 Linyphia sagana Dönitz & Strand, 1906 – Japan
 Linyphia sikkimensis Tikader, 1970 – India
 Linyphia simplicata (F. O. P.-Cambridge, 1902) – Guatemala
 Linyphia subluteae Urquhart, 1893 – Tasmania
 Linyphia tauphora Chamberlin, 1928 – USA
 Linyphia tenuipalpis Simon, 1884 – Europe to Central Asia, Algeria
 Linyphia textrix Walckenaer, 1841 – USA
 Linyphia triangularis (Clerck, 1757) (type species) – Palearctic, introduced in USA
 Linyphia triangularoides Schenkel, 1936 – China
 Linyphia trifalcata (F. O. P.-Cambridge, 1902) – Guatemala
 Linyphia tuasivia Marples, 1955 – Samoa, Aitutaki
 Linyphia tubernaculofaciens Hingston, 1932 – Guyana
 Linyphia virgata (Keyserling, 1886) – Peru
 Linyphia xilitla Gertsch & Davis, 1946 – Mexico
 Linyphia yangmingensis Yin, 2012 – China

Locketidium
Locketidium Jocque, 1981
 Locketidium bosmansi Jocque, 1981 (type species) – Malawi
 Locketidium couloni Jocque, 1981 – Kenya
 Locketidium stuarti Scharff, 1990 – Tanzania

Locketiella
Locketiella Millidge & Russell-Smith, 1992
 Locketiella merretti Millidge, 1995 – Krakatau
 Locketiella parva Millidge & Russell-Smith, 1992 (type species) – Borneo

Locketina
Locketina Kocak & Kemal, 2006
 Locketina fissivulva (Millidge & Russell-Smith, 1992) – Borneo
 Locketina pusilla (Millidge & Russell-Smith, 1992) – Borneo
 Locketina versa (Locket, 1982) (type species) – Malaysia

Lomaita
Lomaita Bryant, 1948
 Lomaita darlingtoni Bryant, 1948 – Hispaniola

Lophomma
Lophomma Menge, 1868
 Lophomma depressum (Emerton, 1882) – USA
 Lophomma punctatum (Blackwall, 1841) (type species) – Palearctic
 Lophomma vaccinii (Emerton, 1926) – USA, Alaska, Russia

Lotusiphantes
Lotusiphantes Chen & Yin, 2001
 Lotusiphantes nanyuensis Chen & Yin, 2001 – China

Lucrinus
Lucrinus O. P.-Cambridge, 1904
 Lucrinus putus O. P.-Cambridge, 1904 – South Africa

Lygarina
Lygarina Simon, 1894
 Lygarina aurantiaca (Simon, 1905) – Argentina
 Lygarina caracasana Simon, 1894 – Venezuela
 Lygarina finitima Millidge, 1991 – Peru
 Lygarina nitida Simon, 1894 (type species) – Brazil
 Lygarina silvicola Millidge, 1991 – Brazil

Machadocara
Machadocara Miller, 1970
 Machadocara dubia Miller, 1970 – Congo
 Machadocara gongylioides Miller, 1970 (type species) – Zambia

Macrargus
Macrargus Dahl, 1886
 Macrargus boreus Holm, 1968 – Sweden, Finland, Estonia, Russia
 Macrargus carpenteri (O. P.-Cambridge, 1894) – Palearctic
 Macrargus multesimus (O. P.-Cambridge, 1875) – Holarctic
 Macrargus rufus (Wider, 1834) (type species) – Palearctic
 Macrargus sumyensis Gnelitsa & Koponen, 2010 – Ukraine, Belarus

Maculoncus
Maculoncus Wunderlich, 1995
 Maculoncus obscurus Tanasevitch, Ponomarev & Chumachenko, 2016 –   Russia (Caucasus) 
 Maculoncus orientalis Tanasevitch, 2011 – Taiwan
 Maculoncus parvipalpus Wunderlich, 1995 (type species) – Greece

Malkinola
Malkinola Miller, 2007
 Malkinola insulanus (Millidge, 1991) – Juan Fernandez Islands

Mansuphantes
Mansuphantes Saaristo & Tanasevitch, 1996
 Mansuphantes arciger (Kulczynski, 1882) – Europe
 Mansuphantes aridus (Thorell, 1875) – Switzerland, Austria, Italy
 Mansuphantes auruncus (Brignoli, 1979) – Italy
 Mansuphantes fragilis (Thorell, 1875) – Europe, Turkey
 Mansuphantes korgei (Saaristo & Tanasevitch, 1996) – Turkey
 Mansuphantes mansuetus (Thorell, 1875) (type species) – Palearctic
 Mansuphantes ovalis (Tanasevitch, 1987) – Russia, Georgia, Azerbaijan
 Mansuphantes parmatus (Tanasevitch, 1990) – Russia, Azerbaijan
 Mansuphantes pseudoarciger (Wunderlich, 1985) – France, Switzerland, Italy
 Mansuphantes rectilamellus (Deltshev, 1988) – Bulgaria
 Mansuphantes rossii (Caporiacco, 1927) – Austria, Italy
 Mansuphantes simoni (Kulczynski, 1894) – Western Europe

Maorineta
Maorineta Millidge, 1988
 Maorineta acerba Millidge, 1988 – New Zealand
 Maorineta ambigua Millidge, 1991 – Marshall Islands, Caroline Islands, Cook Islands
 Maorineta gentilis Millidge, 1988 – New Zealand
 Maorineta minor Millidge, 1988 – New Zealand
 Maorineta mollis Millidge, 1988 – New Zealand
 Maorineta sulcata Millidge, 1988 – New Zealand
 Maorineta tibialis Millidge, 1988 (type species) – New Zealand
 Maorineta tumida Millidge, 1988 – New Zealand

Maro
Maro O. P.-Cambridge, 1906
 Maro amplus Dondale & Buckle, 2001 – Canada, USA
 Maro borealis Eskov, 1991 – Russia
 Maro bulbosus Zhao & Li, 2014 − China 
 Maro bureensis Tanasevitch, 2006 – Russia
 Maro flavescens (O. P.-Cambridge, 1873) – Russia, Mongolia
 Maro khabarum Tanasevitch, 2006 – Russia
 Maro lautus Saito, 1984 – Russia, Japan
 Maro lehtineni Saaristo, 1971 – Europe
 Maro lepidus Casemir, 1961 – Europe
 Maro minutus O. P.-Cambridge, 1906 (type species) – Palearctic
 Maro nearcticus Dondale & Buckle, 2001 – Canada, USA
 Maro pansibiricus Tanasevitch, 2006 – Russia
 Maro perpusillus Saito, 1984 – Japan
 Maro saaristoi Eskov, 1980 – Russia
 Maro sibiricus Eskov, 1980 – Russia
 Maro sublestus Falconer, 1915 – Palearctic
 Maro ussuricus Tanasevitch, 2006 – Russia

Martensinus
Martensinus Wunderlich, 1973
 Martensinus annulatus Wunderlich, 1973 – Nepal
 Martensinus micronetiformis Wunderlich, 1973 (type species) – Nepal

Masikia
Masikia Millidge, 1984
 Masikia bizinia Nekhaeva, Marusik & Buckle, 2019 – Russia (north-east Siberia)
 Masikia caliginosa Millidge, 1984 – Russia (Europe to Far North-East, Kurile Is.), USA (Alaska)
 Masikia indistincta (Kulczynski, 1908) (type species) – Russia, Alaska, Canada
 Masikia relicta (Chamberlin, 1949) – USA

Maso
Maso Simon, 1884
 Maso alticeps (Emerton, 1909) – USA
 Maso douro Bosmans & Cardoso, 2010 – Portugal
 Maso gallicus Simon, 1894 – Europe, Algeria to Azerbaijan
 Maso krakatauensis Bristowe, 1931 – Krakatau
 Maso navajo Chamberlin, 1949 – USA
 Maso politus Banks, 1896 – USA
 Maso sundevalli (Westring, 1851) (type species) – Holarctic

Masoncus
Masoncus Chamberlin, 1949
 Masoncus arienus Chamberlin, 1949 (type species) – USA
 Masoncus conspectus (Gertsch & Davis, 1936) – USA
 Masoncus dux Chamberlin, 1949 – Canada
 Masoncus pogonophilus Cushing, 1995 – USA

Masonetta
Masonetta Chamberlin & Ivie, 1939
 Masonetta floridana (Ivie & Barrows, 1935) – USA

Mecopisthes
Mecopisthes Simon, 1926
 Mecopisthes alter Thaler, 1991 – Italy
 Mecopisthes crassirostris (Simon, 1884) – Portugal, France
 Mecopisthes daiarum Bosmans, 1993 – Algeria
 Mecopisthes jacquelinae Bosmans, 1993 – Morocco
 Mecopisthes latinus Millidge, 1978 – Switzerland, Italy
 Mecopisthes millidgei Wunderlich, 1995 – Sardinia
 Mecopisthes monticola Bosmans, 1993 – Algeria
 Mecopisthes nasutus Wunderlich, 1995 – Greece
 Mecopisthes nicaeensis (Simon, 1884) – France, Italy
 Mecopisthes orientalis Tanasevitch & Fet, 1986 – Turkmenistan
 Mecopisthes paludicola Bosmans, 1993 – Algeria
 Mecopisthes peuceticus Caporiacco, 1951 – Italy
 Mecopisthes peusi Wunderlich, 1972 – Europe, Israel
 Mecopisthes pictonicus Denis, 1949 – France
 Mecopisthes pumilio Wunderlich, 2008 – Switzerland
 Mecopisthes rhomboidalis Gao, Zhu & Gao, 1993 – China
 Mecopisthes silus (O. P.-Cambridge, 1872) (type species) – Europe, Russia
 Mecopisthes tokumotoi Oi, 1964 – Japan

Mecynargoides
Mecynargoides Eskov, 1988
 Mecynargoides kolymensis Eskov, 1988 – Russia, Mongolia

Mecynargus
Mecynargus Kulczynski, 1894
 Mecynargus asiaticus Tanasevitch, 1989 – Kyrgyzstan
 Mecynargus borealis (Jackson, 1930) – Holarctic
 Mecynargus brocchus (L. Koch, 1872) – Europe
 Mecynargus hypnicola Eskov, 1988 – Russia
 Mecynargus longus (Kulczynski, 1882) (type species) – Eastern Europe
 Mecynargus minutipalpis Gnelitsa, 2011 – Ukraine, Russia
 Mecynargus minutus Tanasevitch, 2013 – Russia
 Mecynargus monticola (Holm, 1943) – Sweden, Finland, Russia, Mongolia, Canada
 Mecynargus morulus (O. P.-Cambridge, 1873) – Greenland, Palearctic
 Mecynargus paetulus (O. P.-Cambridge, 1875) – Holarctic
 Mecynargus pinipumilis Eskov, 1988 – Russia
 Mecynargus pyrenaeus (Denis, 1950) – France
 Mecynargus sphagnicola (Holm, 1939) – Greenland, Scandinavia, Russia, Mongolia, Canada
 Mecynargus tundricola Eskov, 1988 – Russia
 Mecynargus tungusicus (Eskov, 1981) – Russia, Kyrgyzstan, China, Canada

Mecynidis
Mecynidis Simon, 1894
 Mecynidis antiqua Jocque & Scharff, 1986 – Tanzania
 Mecynidis ascia Scharff, 1990 – Tanzania
 Mecynidis bitumida Russell-Smith & Jocque, 1986 – Kenya
 Mecynidis dentipalpis Simon, 1894 (type species) – South Africa
 Mecynidis laevitarsis Miller, 1970 – Angola
 Mecynidis muthaiga Russell-Smith & Jocque, 1986 – Kenya
 Mecynidis scutata Jocque & Scharff, 1986 – Tanzania
 Mecynidis spiralis Jocque & Scharff, 1986 – Tanzania

Megafroneta
Megafroneta Blest, 1979
 Megafroneta dugdaleae Blest & Vink, 2002 – New Zealand
 Megafroneta elongata Blest, 1979 (type species) – New Zealand
 Megafroneta gigas Blest, 1979 – New Zealand

Megalepthyphantes
Megalepthyphantes Wunderlich, 1994
 Megalepthyphantes auresensis Bosmans, 2006 – Algeria
 Megalepthyphantes bkheitae (Bosmans & Bouragba, 1992) – Algeria
 Megalepthyphantes brignolii Tanasevitch, 2014 − Morocco 
 Megalepthyphantes camelus (Tanasevitch, 1990) – Iran, Azerbaijan
 Megalepthyphantes collinus (L. Koch, 1872) – Palearctic
 Megalepthyphantes globularis Tanasevitch, 2011 – Turkey
 Megalepthyphantes hellinckxorum Bosmans, 2006 – Algeria
 Megalepthyphantes kandahar Tanasevitch, 2009 – Afghanistan
 Megalepthyphantes kronebergi (Tanasevitch, 1989) – Iran, Kazakhstan to China
 Megalepthyphantes kuhitangensis (Tanasevitch, 1989) – Israel, Central Asia, China
 Megalepthyphantes lydiae Wunderlich, 1994 – Greece
 Megalepthyphantes minotaur Tanasevitch & Wunderlich, 2015 − Crete 
 Megalepthyphantes nebulosoides (Wunderlich, 1977) – Iran, Central Asia
 Megalepthyphantes nebulosus (Sundevall, 1830) (type species) – Holarctic
 Megalepthyphantes pseudocollinus Saaristo, 1997 – Europe, Russia, Iran
 Megalepthyphantes turkestanicus (Tanasevitch, 1989) – Turkmenistan, Afghanistan, China
 Megalepthyphantes turkeyensis Tanasevitch, Kunt & Seyyar, 2005 – Cyprus, Turkey

Mermessus
Mermessus O. P.-Cambridge, 1899
 Mermessus agressus (Gertsch & Davis, 1937) – USA, Mexico
 Mermessus albulus (Zorsch & Crosby, 1934) – USA
 Mermessus annamae (Gertsch & Davis, 1937) – Mexico
 Mermessus antraeus (Crosby, 1926) – USA, Mexico
 Mermessus augustae (Crosby & Bishop, 1933) – USA
 Mermessus augustalis (Crosby & Bishop, 1933) – USA, Canada
 Mermessus avius (Millidge, 1987) – Mexico
 Mermessus brevidentatus (Emerton, 1909) – USA
 Mermessus bryantae (Ivie & Barrows, 1935) – North America, Cuba, Venezuela, Azores
 Mermessus caelebs (Millidge, 1987) – Panama, Venezuela
 Mermessus coahuilanus (Gertsch & Davis, 1940) – USA, Mexico
 Mermessus cognatus (Millidge, 1987) – Mexico to Costa Rica
 Mermessus colimus (Millidge, 1987) – Mexico
 Mermessus comes (Millidge, 1987) – Mexico
 Mermessus conexus (Millidge, 1987) – Mexico
 Mermessus conjunctus (Millidge, 1991) – Brazil
 Mermessus contortus (Emerton, 1882) – USA
 Mermessus denticulatus (Banks, 1898) – USA to Colombia (Europe, North Africa, introduced)
 Mermessus dentiger O. P.-Cambridge, 1899 (type species) – USA to Guatemala, Caribbean
 Mermessus dentimandibulatus (Keyserling, 1886) – Colombia, Peru
 Mermessus dominicus (Millidge, 1987) – Dominica
 Mermessus dopainus (Chamberlin & Ivie, 1936) – Mexico
 Mermessus entomologicus (Emerton, 1911) – USA, Canada
 Mermessus estrellae (Millidge, 1987) – Mexico
 Mermessus facetus (Millidge, 1987) – Costa Rica
 Mermessus floridus (Millidge, 1987) – USA
 Mermessus formosus (Millidge, 1987) – Mexico
 Mermessus fractus (Millidge, 1987) – Costa Rica
 Mermessus fradeorum (Berland, 1932) – Cosmopolitan
 Mermessus fuscus (Millidge, 1987) – Mexico
 Mermessus hebes (Millidge, 1991) – Venezuela
 Mermessus holdus (Chamberlin & Ivie, 1939) – USA, Canada
 Mermessus hospita (Millidge, 1987) – Mexico
 Mermessus ignobilis (Millidge, 1987) – Mexico
 Mermessus imago (Millidge, 1987) – Mexico
 Mermessus index (Emerton, 1914) – USA, Canada
 Mermessus indicabilis (Crosby & Bishop, 1928) – USA
 Mermessus inornatus (Ivie & Barrows, 1935) – USA
 Mermessus insulsus (Millidge, 1991) – Peru
 Mermessus jona (Bishop & Crosby, 1938) – USA, Canada
 Mermessus leoninus (Millidge, 1987) – Mexico
 Mermessus libanus (Millidge, 1987) – Mexico
 Mermessus lindrothi (Holm, 1960) – Alaska
 Mermessus maculatus (Banks, 1892) – Russia, Canada to Guatemala
 Mermessus maderus (Millidge, 1987) – USA
 Mermessus major (Millidge, 1987) – USA
 Mermessus mediocris (Millidge, 1987) – USA, Canada
 Mermessus medius (Millidge, 1987) – Mexico
 Mermessus merus (Millidge, 1987) – Mexico
 Mermessus mniarus (Crosby & Bishop, 1928) – USA
 Mermessus modicus (Millidge, 1987) – USA
 Mermessus montanus (Millidge, 1987) – Mexico
 Mermessus monticola (Millidge, 1987) – Mexico
 Mermessus moratus (Millidge, 1987) – Mexico
 Mermessus naniwaensis (Oi, 1960) – China, Japan
 Mermessus nigrus (Millidge, 1991) – Colombia
 Mermessus obscurus (Millidge, 1991) – Colombia
 Mermessus orbus (Millidge, 1987) – Mexico
 Mermessus ornatus (Millidge, 1987) – Mexico
 Mermessus paludosus (Millidge, 1987) – Canada
 Mermessus paulus (Millidge, 1987) – USA
 Mermessus perplexus (Millidge, 1987) – Mexico
 Mermessus persimilis (Millidge, 1987) – Mexico
 Mermessus pinicola (Millidge, 1987) – Mexico
 Mermessus probus (Millidge, 1987) – Mexico
 Mermessus proximus (Keyserling, 1886) – Peru
 Mermessus rapidulus (Bishop & Crosby, 1938) – Nicaragua, Costa Rica, Panama
 Mermessus singularis (Millidge, 1987) – Mexico
 Mermessus socius (Chamberlin, 1949) – USA
 Mermessus sodalis (Millidge, 1987) – USA
 Mermessus solitus (Millidge, 1987) – USA
 Mermessus solus (Millidge, 1987) – Mexico
 Mermessus subantillanus (Millidge, 1987) – Guadeloupe
 Mermessus taibo (Chamberlin & Ivie, 1933) – USA, Canada
 Mermessus tenuipalpis (Emerton, 1911) – USA
 Mermessus tepejicanus (Gertsch & Davis, 1937) – Mexico
 Mermessus tibialis (Millidge, 1987) – USA
 Mermessus tlaxcalanus (Gertsch & Davis, 1937) – Mexico
 Mermessus tridentatus (Emerton, 1882) – USA, Canada, Puerto Rico
 Mermessus trilobatus (Emerton, 1882) – Holarctic
 Mermessus undulatus (Emerton, 1914) – USA, Canada

Mesasigone
Mesasigone Tanasevitch, 1989
 Mesasigone mira Tanasevitch, 1989 – Russia, Iran, Kazakhstan to China

Metafroneta
Metafroneta Blest, 1979
 Metafroneta minima Blest, 1979 – New Zealand
 Metafroneta sinuosa Blest, 1979 (type species) – New Zealand
 Metafroneta subversa Blest & Vink, 2002 – New Zealand

Metaleptyphantes
Metaleptyphantes Locket, 1968
 Metaleptyphantes bifoliatus Locket, 1968 – Angola
 Metaleptyphantes cameroonensis Bosmans, 1986 – Cameroon
 Metaleptyphantes carinatus Locket, 1968 – Angola
 Metaleptyphantes clavator Locket, 1968 – Congo, Angola, Kenya, Tanzania
 Metaleptyphantes dentiferens Bosmans, 1979 – Kenya
 Metaleptyphantes dubius Locket & Russell-Smith, 1980 – Nigeria
 Metaleptyphantes familiaris Jocque, 1984 – South Africa
 Metaleptyphantes foulfouldei Bosmans, 1986 – Cameroon
 Metaleptyphantes kraepelini (Simon, 1905) – Java
 Metaleptyphantes machadoi Locket, 1968 (type species) – Cameroon, Nigeria, Gabon, Angola, Uganda, Tanzania
 Metaleptyphantes ovatus Scharff, 1990 – Tanzania
 Metaleptyphantes perexiguus (Simon & Fage, 1922) – Africa, Comoro Islands
 Metaleptyphantes praecipuus Locket, 1968 – Angola, Seychelles
 Metaleptyphantes triangulatus Holm, 1968 – Congo
 Metaleptyphantes uncinatus Holm, 1968 – Congo
 Metaleptyphantes vates Jocque, 1983 – Gabon
 Metaleptyphantes vicinus Locket, 1968 – Angola

Metamynoglenes
Metamynoglenes Blest, 1979
 Metamynoglenes absurda Blest & Vink, 2002 – New Zealand
 Metamynoglenes attenuata Blest, 1979 – New Zealand
 Metamynoglenes flagellata Blest, 1979 – New Zealand
 Metamynoglenes gracilis Blest, 1979 – New Zealand
 Metamynoglenes helicoides Blest, 1979 – New Zealand
 Metamynoglenes incurvata Blest, 1979 (type species) – New Zealand
 Metamynoglenes magna Blest, 1979 – New Zealand
 Metamynoglenes ngongotaha Blest & Vink, 2002 – New Zealand

Metapanamomops
Metapanamomops Millidge, 1977
 Metapanamomops kaestneri (Wiehle, 1961) – Germany to Ukraine

Metopobactrus
Metopobactrus Simon, 1884
 Metopobactrus ascitus (Kulczynski, 1894) – Eastern Europe
 Metopobactrus cavernicola Wunderlich, 1992 – Canary Islands
 Metopobactrus deserticola Loksa, 1981 – Hungary
 Metopobactrus falcifrons Simon, 1884 (type species) – France
 Metopobactrus nadigi Thaler, 1976 – Switzerland, Austria, Italy
 Metopobactrus nodicornis Schenkel, 1927 – Switzerland, Austria
 Metopobactrus orbelicus Deltshev, 1985 – Bulgaria
 Metopobactrus pacificus Emerton, 1923 – USA
 Metopobactrus prominulus (O. P.-Cambridge, 1872) – Holarctic
 Metopobactrus verticalis (Simon, 1881) – France, Corsica

Micrargus
Micrargus Dahl, 1886
 Micrargus aleuticus Holm, 1960 – Alaska
 Micrargus alpinus Relys & Weiss, 1997 – Germany, Switzerland, Austria
 Micrargus apertus (O. P.-Cambridge, 1871) – Palearctic
 Micrargus cavernicola Wunderlich, 1995 – Japan
 Micrargus cupidon (Simon, 1913) – France
 Micrargus dilutus (Denis, 1948) – France
 Micrargus dissimilis Denis, 1950 – France
 Micrargus fuscipalpis (Denis, 1962) −Uganda 
 Micrargus georgescuae Millidge, 1976 – Europe
 Micrargus herbigradus (Blackwall, 1854) (type species) – Palearctic
 Micrargus hokkaidoensis Wunderlich, 1995 – Japan
 Micrargus laudatus (O. P.-Cambridge, 1881) – Europe
 Micrargus longitarsus (Emerton, 1882) – USA, Canada
 Micrargus nibeoventris (Komatsu, 1942) – Japan
 Micrargus parvus Wunderlich, 2011 – Canary Islands
 Micrargus pervicax (Denis, 1947) – France, possibly Austria
 Micrargus subaequalis (Westring, 1851) – Palearctic

Microbathyphantes
Microbathyphantes van Helsdingen, 1985
 Microbathyphantes aokii (Saito, 1982) – China, Vietnam, Japan
 Microbathyphantes celebes Tanasevitch, 2012 – Sulawesi
 Microbathyphantes palmarius (Marples, 1955) (type species) – Sri Lanka, India, Seychelles, Myanmar, Polynesia
 Microbathyphantes spedani (Locket, 1968) – Cameroon, Nigeria, Angola
 Microbathyphantes tateyamaensis (Oi, 1960) – Japan

Microctenonyx
Microctenonyx Dahl, 1886
 Microctenonyx apuliae (Caporiacco, 1951) – Italy
 Microctenonyx cavifrons (Caporiacco, 1935) – Karakorum
 Microctenonyx evansae (Locket & Russell-Smith, 1980) – Nigeria
 Microctenonyx subitaneus (O. P.-Cambridge, 1875) (type species) – Holarctic (elsewhere, introduced)

Microcyba
Microcyba Holm, 1962
 Microcyba aculeata Holm, 1964 – Congo
 Microcyba affinis Holm, 1962 – Uganda
 Microcyba angulata Holm, 1962 – Kenya, Uganda
 Microcyba brevidentata Holm, 1962 – Tanzania
 Microcyba calida Jocque, 1983 – Gabon
 Microcyba cameroonensis Bosmans, 1988 – Cameroon
 Microcyba divisa Jocque, 1983 – Gabon
 Microcyba erecta Holm, 1962 – Uganda
 Microcyba falcata Holm, 1962 (type species) – Uganda
 Microcyba hamata Holm, 1962 – Kenya, Uganda
 Microcyba hedbergi Holm, 1962 – Uganda
 Microcyba leleupi Holm, 1968 – Congo
 Microcyba projecta Holm, 1962 – Uganda
 Microcyba simulata Holm, 1962 – Kenya
 Microcyba tridentata Holm, 1962 – Kenya, Uganda
 Microcyba vancotthemi Bosmans, 1977 – Kenya
 Microcyba viduata Holm, 1962 – Kenya
 Microcyba vilhenai Miller, 1970 – Congo

Microlinyphia
Microlinyphia Gerhardt, 1928
 Microlinyphia aethiopica (Tullgren, 1910) – East Africa
 Microlinyphia cylindriformis Jocque, 1985 – Comoro Islands
 Microlinyphia dana (Chamberlin & Ivie, 1943) – USA, Canada, Alaska
 Microlinyphia delesserti (Caporiacco, 1949) – Tanzania, Uganda, Congo
 Microlinyphia impigra (O. P.-Cambridge, 1871) – Holarctic
 Microlinyphia johnsoni (Blackwall, 1859) – Madeira, Canary Islands
 Microlinyphia mandibulata (Emerton, 1882) – USA
 Microlinyphia mandibulata punctata (Chamberlin & Ivie, 1943) – USA, Canada
 Microlinyphia pusilla (Sundevall, 1830) (type species) – Holarctic
 Microlinyphia pusilla quadripunctata (Strand, 1903) – Norway
 Microlinyphia simoni van Helsdingen, 1970 – Madagascar
 Microlinyphia sterilis (Pavesi, 1883) – Central, East, Southern Africa; China
 Microlinyphia zhejiangensis (Chen, 1991) – China

Microneta
Microneta Menge, 1869
 Microneta caestata (Thorell, 1875) – Sweden
 Microneta disceptra Crosby & Bishop, 1929 – Peru
 Microneta flaveola Banks, 1892 – USA
 Microneta formicaria Balogh, 1938 – New Guinea
 Microneta inops (Thorell, 1875) – Sweden
 Microneta orines Chamberlin & Ivie, 1933 – USA
 Microneta semiatra (Keyserling, 1886) – Brazil
 Microneta sima Chamberlin & Ivie, 1936 – Mexico
 Microneta varia Simon, 1897 – St. Vincent
 Microneta viaria (Blackwall, 1841) (type species) – Holarctic
 Microneta watona Chamberlin & Ivie, 1936 – Mexico

Microplanus
Microplanus Millidge, 1991
 Microplanus mollis Millidge, 1991 (type species) – Colombia
 Microplanus odin Miller, 2007 – Panama

Midia
Midia Saaristo & Wunderlich, 1995
 Midia midas (Simon, 1884) – Europe

Miftengris
Miftengris Eskov, 1993
 Miftengris scutumatus Eskov, 1993 – Russia

Millidgea
Millidgea Locket, 1968
 Millidgea convoluta Locket, 1968 (type species) – Angola
 Millidgea navicula Locket, 1968 – Angola
 Millidgea verrucosa Locket, 1968 – Angola

Millidgella
Millidgella Kammerer, 2006
 Millidgella trisetosa (Millidge, 1985) – Chile, Argentina

Minicia
Minicia Thorell, 1875
 Minicia alticola Tanasevitch, 1990 – Georgia
 Minicia candida Denis, 1946 – Europe
 Minicia candida obscurior Denis, 1963 – France
 Minicia caspiana Tanasevitch, 1990 – Azerbaijan
 Minicia elegans Simon, 1894 – Portugal, Algeria
 Minicia floresensis Wunderlich, 1992 – Azores
 Minicia gomerae (Schmidt, 1975) – Canary Islands
 Minicia grancanariensis Wunderlich, 1987 – Canary Islands
 Minicia kirghizica Tanasevitch, 1985 – Central Asia
 Minicia marginella (Wider, 1834) (type species) – Palearctic
 Minicia pallida Eskov, 1995 – Russia, Kazakhstan
 Minicia teneriffensis Wunderlich, 1979 – Canary Islands
 Minicia vittata Caporiacco, 1935 – Kashmir

Minyriolus
Minyriolus Simon, 1884
 Minyriolus australis Simon, 1902 – Argentina
 Minyriolus medusa (Simon, 1881) – Europe
 Minyriolus phaulobius (Thorell, 1875) – Italy
 Minyriolus pusillus (Wider, 1834) (type species) – Palearctic

Mioxena
Mioxena Simon, 1926
 Mioxena blanda (Simon, 1884) (type species) – Europe, Russia
 Mioxena celisi Holm, 1968 – Congo, Kenya
 Mioxena longispinosa Miller, 1970 – Angola

Mitrager
Mitrager van Helsdingen, 1985
 Mitrager noordami van Helsdingen, 1985 – Java

Moebelia
Moebelia Dahl, 1886
 Moebelia berolinensis (Wunderlich, 1969) – Germany
 Moebelia penicillata (Westring, 1851) (type species) – Palearctic
 Moebelia rectangula Song & Li, 2007 – China

Moebelotinus
Moebelotinus Wunderlich, 1995
 Moebelotinus transbaikalicus (Eskov, 1989) – Russia, Mongolia

Molestia
Molestia Tu, Saaristo & Li, 2006
 Molestia molesta (Tao, Li & Zhu, 1995) – China

Monocephalus
Monocephalus Smith, 1906
 Monocephalus castaneipes (Simon, 1884) – Europe
 Monocephalus fuscipes (Blackwall, 1836) (type species) – Europe

Monocerellus
Monocerellus Tanasevitch, 1983
 Monocerellus montanus Tanasevitch, 1983 – Russia

Montilaira
Montilaira Chamberlin, 1921
 Montilaira uta (Chamberlin, 1919) – USA

Moreiraxena
Moreiraxena Miller, 1970
 Moreiraxena chicapensis Miller, 1970 – Angola

Moyosi
Moyosi Miller, 2007
 Moyosi chumota Miller, 2007 – Guyana
 Moyosi prativaga (Keyserling, 1886) (type species) – Brazil, Argentina
 Moyosi rugosa (Millidge, 1991) – Argentina

Mughiphantes
Mughiphantes Saaristo & Tanasevitch, 1999
 Mughiphantes aculifer (Tanasevitch, 1988) – Russia
 Mughiphantes afghanus (Denis, 1958) – Afghanistan
 Mughiphantes alticola (Tanasevitch, 1987) – Nepal
 Mughiphantes anachoretus (Tanasevitch, 1987) – Nepal
 Mughiphantes ancoriformis (Tanasevitch, 1987) – Nepal
 Mughiphantes arlaudi (Denis, 1954) – France
 Mughiphantes armatus (Kulczynski, 1905) – Central Europe
 Mughiphantes baebleri (Lessert, 1910) – Central Europe
 Mughiphantes beishanensis Tanasevitch, 2006 – China
 Mughiphantes bicornis Tanasevitch & Saaristo, 2006 – Nepal
 Mughiphantes brunneri (Thaler, 1984) – Italy
 Mughiphantes carnicus (van Helsdingen, 1982) – Italy
 Mughiphantes cornutus (Schenkel, 1927) – Palearctic
 Mughiphantes cuspidatus Tanasevitch & Saaristo, 2006 – Nepal
 Mughiphantes edentulus Tanasevitch, 2010 – UAE
 Mughiphantes falxus Tanasevitch & Saaristo, 2006 – Nepal
 Mughiphantes faustus (Tanasevitch, 1987) – Nepal
 Mughiphantes hadzii (Miller & Polenec, 1975) – Slovenia
 Mughiphantes handschini (Schenkel, 1919) – Central Europe
 Mughiphantes hindukuschensis (Miller & Buchar, 1972) – Afghanistan
 Mughiphantes ignavus (Simon, 1884) – France
 Mughiphantes inermus Tanasevitch & Saaristo, 2006 – Nepal
 Mughiphantes jaegeri Tanasevitch, 2006 – China
 Mughiphantes johannislupi (Denis, 1953) – France
 Mughiphantes jugorum (Denis, 1954) – France
 Mughiphantes lithoclasicola (Deltshev, 1983) – Bulgaria
 Mughiphantes logunovi Tanasevitch, 2000 – Russia
 Mughiphantes longiproper Tanasevitch & Saaristo, 2006 – Nepal
 Mughiphantes martensi Tanasevitch, 2006 – China
 Mughiphantes marusiki (Tanasevitch, 1988) – Russia, Mongolia
 Mughiphantes merretti (Millidge, 1975) – Italy
 Mughiphantes mughi (Fickert, 1875) (type species) – Europe, Russia
 Mughiphantes nigromaculatus (Zhu & Wen, 1983) – Russia, China
 Mughiphantes numilionis (Tanasevitch, 1987) – Nepal
 Mughiphantes occultus (Tanasevitch, 1987) – Nepal
 Mughiphantes omega (Denis, 1952) – Romania
 Mughiphantes ovtchinnikovi (Tanasevitch, 1989) – Kyrgyzstan
 Mughiphantes pulcher (Kulczynski, 1881) – Central Europe
 Mughiphantes pulcheroides (Wunderlich, 1985) – Italy
 Mughiphantes pyrenaeus (Denis, 1953) – France
 Mughiphantes restrictus Tanasevitch & Saaristo, 2006 – Nepal
 Mughiphantes rotundatus (Tanasevitch, 1987) – Nepal
 Mughiphantes rupium (Thaler, 1984) – Germany, Austria
 Mughiphantes setifer (Tanasevitch, 1987) – Nepal
 Mughiphantes setosus Tanasevitch & Saaristo, 2006 – Nepal
 Mughiphantes severus (Thaler, 1990) – Austria
 Mughiphantes sherpa (Tanasevitch, 1987) – Nepal
 Mughiphantes sobrioides Tanasevitch, 2000 – Russia
 Mughiphantes sobrius (Thorell, 1871) – Norway, Russia
 Mughiphantes styriacus (Thaler, 1984) – Austria
 Mughiphantes suffusus (Strand, 1901) – Scandinavia, Russia
 Mughiphantes taczanowskii (O. P.-Cambridge, 1873) – Russia, Mongolia
 Mughiphantes tienschangensis (Tanasevitch, 1986) – Central Asia
 Mughiphantes triglavensis (Miller & Polenec, 1975) – Austria, Slovenia
 Mughiphantes variabilis (Kulczynski, 1887) – Central Europe
 Mughiphantes varians (Kulczynski, 1882) – Eastern Europe
 Mughiphantes vittatus (Spassky, 1941) – Central Asia
 Mughiphantes whymperi (F. O. P.-Cambridge, 1894) – Ireland, Britain, Finland, Russia
 Mughiphantes yadongensis (Hu, 2001) – China
 Mughiphantes yeti (Tanasevitch, 1987) – Nepal

Murphydium
Murphydium Jocque, 1996
 Murphydium foliatum Jocque, 1996 – Kenya, Somalia

Mycula
Mycula Schikora, 1994
 Mycula mossakowskii Schikora, 1994 – Germany, Austria, Italy

Myrmecomelix
Myrmecomelix Millidge, 1993
 Myrmecomelix leucippus Miller, 2007 – Peru
 Myrmecomelix pulcher (Millidge, 1991) (type species) – Ecuador, Peru

Mythoplastoides
Mythoplastoides Crosby & Bishop, 1933
 Mythoplastoides erectus (Emerton, 1915) – USA
 Mythoplastoides exiguus (Banks, 1892) (type species) – USA

Napometa
Napometa Benoit, 1977
 Napometa sanctaehelenae Benoit, 1977 (type species) – St. Helena
 Napometa trifididens (O. P.-Cambridge, 1873) – St. Helena

Nasoona
Nasoona Locket, 1982
Nasoona asocialis (Wunderlich, 1974) – China, Nepal, India, Laos, Thailand, Malaysia
Nasoona chrysanthusi Locket, 1982 – Malaysia, Singapore
Nasoona comata (Tanasevitch, 1998) – Nepal
Nasoona conica (Tanasevitch, 1998) – Nepal
Nasoona coronata (Simon, 1894) – Venezuela
Nasoona crucifera (Thorell, 1895) – China, Myanmar, Thailand, Vietnam, Laos, Malaysia
Nasoona indiana Tanasevitch, 2018 – India
Nasoona intuberosa Tanasevitch, 2018 – Malaysia (Borneo)
Nasoona kinabalu Tanasevitch, 2018 – Malaysia (Borneo)
Nasoona locketi Millidge, 1995 – Krakatau
Nasoona orissa Tanasevitch, 2018 – India, Sri Lanka
Nasoona nigromaculata Gao, Fei & Xing, 1996 – China
Nasoona prominula Locket, 1982T (type species) – Malaysia
Nasoona sabah Tanasevitch, 2018 – Malaysia (Borneo)
Nasoona setifera (Tanasevitch, 1998) – Nepal
Nasoona silvestris Millidge, 1995 – Indonesia
Nasoona wunderlichi (Brignoli, 1983) – Nepal

Nasoonaria
Nasoonaria Wunderlich & Song, 1995
 Nasoonaria mada Tanasevitch, 2018 − Vietnam
 Nasoonaria magna Tanasevitch, 2014 − China, Thailand
 Nasoonaria pseudoembolica Tanasevitch, 2019 − Vietnam
 Nasoonaria sinensis Wunderlich & Song, 1995 (type species) – China

Nematogmus
Nematogmus Simon, 1884
 Nematogmus asiaticus Tanasevitch, 2014 – Laos, Thailand
 Nematogmus dentimanus Simon, 1886 – Sri Lanka to Malaysia, Java, Krakatau
 Nematogmus digitatus Fei & Zhu, 1994 – China
 Nematogmus longior Song & Li, 2008 – China
 Nematogmus membranifer Song & Li, 2008 – China
 Nematogmus nigripes Hu, 2001 – China
 Nematogmus rutilis Oi, 1960 – Japan
 Nematogmus sanguinolentus (Walckenaer, 1841) (type species) – Palearctic
 Nematogmus stylitus (Bösenberg & Strand, 1906) – China, Japan

Nenilinium
Nenilinium Eskov, 1988
 Nenilinium asiaticum Eskov, 1988 (type species) – Russia
 Nenilinium luteolum (Loksa, 1965) – Russia, Mongolia

Nentwigia
Nentwigia Millidge, 1995
 Nentwigia diffusa Millidge, 1995 – Thailand, Krakatau

Neocautinella
Neocautinella Baert, 1990
 Neocautinella neoterica (Keyserling, 1886) – Ecuador, Peru, Bolivia, Galapagos Islands

Neodietrichia
Neodietrichia Özdikmen, 2008
 Neodietrichia hesperia (Crosby & Bishop, 1933) – USA, Canada

Neoeburnella
Neoeburnella Kocak, 1986
 Neoeburnella avocalis (Jocque & Bosmans, 1983) – Ivory Coast

Neomaso
Neomaso Forster, 1970
 Neomaso abnormis Millidge, 1991 – Chile
 Neomaso aequabilis Millidge, 1991 – Argentina
 Neomaso angusticeps Millidge, 1985 – Chile
 Neomaso antarcticus (Hickman, 1939) – Kerguelen, Marion Islands
 Neomaso articeps Millidge, 1991 – Chile
 Neomaso arundicola Millidge, 1991 – Brazil
 Neomaso bilobatus (Tullgren, 1901) – Chile
 Neomaso claggi Forster, 1970 (type species) – Chile, South Georgia
 Neomaso damocles Miller, 2007 – Brazil, Argentina
 Neomaso fagicola Millidge, 1985 – Chile
 Neomaso fluminensis Millidge, 1991 – Chile
 Neomaso insperatus Millidge, 1991 – Argentina
 Neomaso insulanus Millidge, 1991 – Juan Fernandez Islands
 Neomaso minimus Millidge, 1985 – Chile
 Neomaso parvus Millidge, 1985 – Chile
 Neomaso patagonicus (Tullgren, 1901) – Chile, Argentina
 Neomaso peltatus Millidge, 1985 – Chile
 Neomaso pollicatus (Tullgren, 1901) – Chile, Argentina, Falkland Islands
 Neomaso scutatus Millidge, 1985 – Chile
 Neomaso setiger Millidge, 1991 – Chile
 Neomaso vicinus Millidge, 1991 – Argentina

Neonesiotes
Neonesiotes Millidge, 1991
 Neonesiotes hamatus Millidge, 1991 – Caroline Islands
 Neonesiotes remiformis Millidge, 1991 (type species) – Seychelles, Marshall Islands, Caroline Islands, Cook Islands, Fiji, Samoa

Neriene
Neriene Blackwall, 1833
 Neriene albolimbata (Karsch, 1879) – Russia (Far East), China, Korea, Taiwan, Japan
 Neriene amiculata (Simon, 1905) – Java
 Neriene angulifera (Schenkel, 1953) – Russia (Far East), China, Japan
 Neriene aquilirostralis Chen & Zhu, 1989 – China
 Neriene bayawanga (Barrion & Litsinger, 1995) – Philippines
 Neriene beccarii (Thorell, 1890) – Sumatra
 Neriene birmanica (Thorell, 1887) – India, Myanmar, Laos, China, Indonesia (Bali)
 Neriene brongersmai van Helsdingen, 1969 – Japan
 Neriene calozonata Chen & Zhu, 1989 – China
 Neriene cavaleriei (Schenkel, 1963) – China, Vietnam
 Neriene chunan Yin, 2012 – Chunan
 Neriene circifolia Zhao & Li, 2014 – China
 Neriene clathrata (Sundevall, 1830) (type species) – North America, Europe, North Africa, Caucasus, Russia (Europe to Far East), Iran, Central Asia, China, Korea, Japan
 Neriene comoroensis Locket, 1980 – Comoros
 Neriene compta Zhu & Sha, 1986 – China
 Neriene conica (Locket, 1968) – Angola, Rwanda, Kenya
 Neriene coosa (Gertsch, 1951) – Russia (Sakhalin), USA
 Neriene decormaculata Chen & Zhu, 1988 – China
 Neriene digna (Keyserling, 1886) – USA, Canada
 Neriene emphana (Walckenaer, 1842) – Europe, Caucasus, Russia (Europe to Far East), Central Asia, China, Korea, Japan
 Neriene flammea van Helsdingen, 1969 – South Africa
 Neriene furtiva (O. P.-Cambridge, 1871) – Europe, North Africa, Russia (Europe to South Siberia)
 Neriene fusca (Oi, 1960) – Japan
 Neriene guanga (Barrion & Litsinger, 1995) – Philippines
 Neriene gyirongana Hu, 2001 – China
 Neriene hammeni (van Helsdingen, 1963) – Netherlands, Belgium, France, Germany, China?
 Neriene helsdingeni (Locket, 1968) – Africa
 Neriene herbosa (Oi, 1960) – China, Japan
 Neriene japonica (Oi, 1960) – Russia (Far East), China, Korea, Japan
 Neriene jinjooensis Paik, 1991 – China, Korea, Japan
 Neriene kartala Jocqué, 1985 – Comoros
 Neriene katyae van Helsdingen, 1969 – Sri Lanka
 Neriene kibonotensis (Tullgren, 1910) – West, Central, East Africa
 Neriene kimyongkii (Paik, 1965) – Korea
 Neriene limbatinella (Bösenberg & Strand, 1906) – Russia (Far East), China, Korea, Japan
 Neriene litigiosa (Keyserling, 1886) – North America. Introduced to China
 Neriene longipedella (Bösenberg & Strand, 1906) – Russia (Far East), China, Korea, Japan
 Neriene lushanensis Li, Liu & Chen, 2018 – China
 Neriene macella (Thorell, 1898) – India, China, Myanmar, Thailand, Laos, Malaysia (peninsula), Indonesia (Sumatra, Java), Philippines
 Neriene marginella (Oi, 1960) – Japan
 Neriene montana (Clerck, 1757) – Europe, Caucasus, Russia (Europe to Far East), Central Asia, Japan
 Neriene natalensis van Helsdingen, 1969 – South Africa
 Neriene nitens Zhu & Chen, 1991 – China
 Neriene obtusa (Locket, 1968) – Africa
 Neriene obtusoides Bosmans & Jocqué, 1983 – Cameroon
 Neriene oidedicata van Helsdingen, 1969 – Russia (Far East), China, Korea, Japan
 Neriene orthocera Li, Liu & Chen, 2018 – China
 Neriene oxycera Tu & Li, 2006 – Laos, Thailand, Vietnam
 Neriene peltata (Wider, 1834) – Greenland, Europe, Caucasus, Russia (Europe to South Siberia), Iran
 Neriene poculiforma Liu & Chen, 2010 – China
 Neriene radiata (Walckenaer, 1842) – North America, Europe, Turkey, Caucasus, Russia (Europe to Far East), Kazakhstan, China, Korea, Japan
 Neriene redacta Chamberlin, 1925 – USA
 Neriene strandia (Blauvelt, 1936) – China, Borneo
 Neriene subarctica Marusik, 1991 – Russia (Middle Siberia to Far East)
 Neriene sundaica (Simon, 1905) – Indonesia (Java, Lombok)
 Neriene tiniktirika (Barrion & Litsinger, 1995) – Philippines
 Neriene variabilis (Banks, 1892) – USA
 Neriene yani Chen & Yin, 1999 – China
 Neriene zanhuangica Zhu & Tu, 1986 – China
 Neriene zhui Chen & Li, 1995 – China (Hainan)

Neserigone
Neserigone Eskov, 1992
 Neserigone basarukini Eskov, 1992 (type species) – Russia, Japan
 Neserigone nigriterminorum (Oi, 1960) – Japan
 Neserigone torquipalpis (Oi, 1960) – Japan

Nesioneta
Nesioneta Millidge, 1991
 Nesioneta arabica Tanasevitch, 2010 – UAE
 Nesioneta benoiti (van Helsdingen, 1978) – Sri Lanka, Seychelles
 Nesioneta elegans Millidge, 1991 – Caroline Islands, Fiji
 Nesioneta ellipsoidalis Tu & Li, 2006 – Vietnam
 Nesioneta lepida Millidge, 1991 (type species) – Marshall Islands, Caroline Islands, Hawaii
 Nesioneta muriensis (Wunderlich, 1983) – Nepal
 Nesioneta pacificana (Berland, 1935) – Pacific Islands
 Nesioneta similis Millidge, 1991 – Caroline Islands
 Nesioneta sola (Millidge & Russell-Smith, 1992) – Sulawesi

Nippononeta
Nippononeta Eskov, 1992
 Nippononeta alpina (Li & Zhu, 1993) – Japan
 Nippononeta bursa Yin, 2012 – China
 Nippononeta cheunghensis (Paik, 1978) – Korea
 Nippononeta coreana (Paik, 1991) – China, Korea
 Nippononeta elongata Ono & Saito, 2001 – Japan
 Nippononeta embolica Tanasevitch, 2005 – Russia
 Nippononeta kaiensis Ono & Saito, 2001 – Japan
 Nippononeta kantonis Ono & Saito, 2001 – Japan
 Nippononeta kurilensis Eskov, 1992 (type species) – Russia, Japan
 Nippononeta masatakana Ono & Saito, 2001 – Japan
 Nippononeta masudai Ono & Saito, 2001 – Japan
 Nippononeta minuta (Oi, 1960) – Japan
 Nippononeta nodosa (Oi, 1960) – Japan
 Nippononeta obliqua (Oi, 1960) – Korea, Japan
 Nippononeta ogatai Ono & Saito, 2001 – Japan
 Nippononeta okumae Ono & Saito, 2001 – Japan
 Nippononeta onoi Bao, Bai & Tu, 2017 − Japan 
 Nippononeta pentagona (Oi, 1960) – Mongolia, Japan
 Nippononeta projecta (Oi, 1960) – Mongolia, Korea, Japan
 Nippononeta silvicola Ono & Saito, 2001 – Japan
 Nippononeta sinica Tanasevitch, 2006 – China
 Nippononeta subnigra Ono & Saito, 2001 – Japan
 Nippononeta ungulata (Oi, 1960) – Korea, Japan
 Nippononeta xiphoidea Ono & Saito, 2001 – Japan

Nipponotusukuru
Nipponotusukuru Saito & Ono, 2001
 Nipponotusukuru enzanensis Saito & Ono, 2001 (type species) – Japan
 Nipponotusukuru spiniger Saito & Ono, 2001 – Japan

Nispa
Nispa Eskov, 1993
 Nispa barbatus Eskov, 1993 – Russia, Japan

Notholepthyphantes
Notholepthyphantes Millidge, 1985
 Notholepthyphantes australis (Tullgren, 1901) (type species) – Chile
 Notholepthyphantes erythrocerus (Simon, 1902) – Chile

Nothophantes
Nothophantes Merrett & Stevens, 1995
 Nothophantes horridus Merrett & Stevens, 1995 – England

Notiogyne
Notiogyne Tanasevitch, 2007
 Notiogyne falcata Tanasevitch, 2007 – Russia

Notiohyphantes
Notiohyphantes Millidge, 1985
 Notiohyphantes excelsus (Keyserling, 1886) – Mexico to Peru, Brazil, Galapagos Islands
 Notiohyphantes laudatus Millidge, 1991 – Brazil
 Notiohyphantes meridionalis (Tullgren, 1901) (type species) – Chile

Notiomaso
Notiomaso Banks, 1914
 Notiomaso australis Banks, 1914 (type species) – Falkland Islands, South Georgia
 Notiomaso barbatus (Tullgren, 1901) – Chile, Argentina, Falkland Islands
 Notiomaso christina Lavery & Snazell, 2013 – Falkland Islands
 Notiomaso exonychus Miller, 2007 – Chile
 Notiomaso flavus Tambs-Lyche, 1954 – Falkland Islands, South Georgia
 Notiomaso grytvikensis (Tambs-Lyche, 1954) – South Georgia
 Notiomaso shackletoni Lavery & Snazell, 2013 – Falkland Islands
 Notiomaso spei Lavery & Snazell, 2018 – South Georgia
 Notiomaso striatus (Usher, 1983) – Falkland Islands

Notioscopus
Notioscopus Simon, 1884
 Notioscopus australis Simon, 1894 – South Africa
 Notioscopus sarcinatus (O. P.-Cambridge, 1872) (type species) – Europe, Russia
 Notioscopus sibiricus Tanasevitch, 2007 – Russia, Mongolia, China, Sakhalin Islands

Notolinga
Notolinga Lavery & Dupérré, 2019
 Notolinga fuegiana (Simon, 1902) – Argentina & Falkland Islands

Novafroneta
Novafroneta Blest, 1979
 Novafroneta annulipes Blest, 1979 – New Zealand
 Novafroneta gladiatrix Blest, 1979 – New Zealand
 Novafroneta nova Blest & Vink, 2003 – New Zealand
 Novafroneta parmulata Blest, 1979 – New Zealand
 Novafroneta truncata Blest & Vink, 2003 – New Zealand
 Novafroneta vulgaris Blest, 1979 (type species) – New Zealand

Novafrontina
Novafrontina Millidge, 1991
 Novafrontina bipunctata (Keyserling, 1886) (type species) – Ecuador, Peru
 Novafrontina patens Millidge, 1991 – Colombia
 Novafrontina uncata (F. O. P.-Cambridge, 1902) – Mexico to Brazil

Novalaetesia
Novalaetesia Millidge, 1988
 Novalaetesia anceps Millidge, 1988 (type species) – New Zealand
 Novalaetesia atra Blest & Vink, 2003 – New Zealand

Nusoncus
Nusoncus Wunderlich, 2008
 Nusoncus nasutus (Schenkel, 1925) – Europe

Oaphantes
Oaphantes Chamberlin & Ivie, 1943
 Oaphantes pallidulus (Banks, 1904) – USA

Obrimona
Obrimona Strand, 1934
 Obrimona tennenti (Simon, 1894) – Sri Lanka

Obscuriphantes
Obscuriphantes Saaristo & Tanasevitch, 2000
 Obscuriphantes bacelarae (Schenkel, 1938) – Portugal, France
 Obscuriphantes obscurus (Blackwall, 1841) (type species) – Palearctic
 Obscuriphantes obscurus dilutior (Simon, 1929) – Europe
 Obscuriphantes pseudoobscurus (Marusik, Hippa & Koponen, 1996) – Russia

Oculocornia
Oculocornia Oliger, 1985
 Oculocornia orientalis Oliger, 1985 – Russia

Oedothorax
Oedothorax Bertkau, in Förster & Bertkau, 1883
 Oedothorax agrestis (Blackwall, 1853) – Palearctic
 Oedothorax agrestis longipes (Simon, 1884) – Switzerland
 Oedothorax alascensis (Banks, 1900) – Alaska
 Oedothorax angelus Tanasevitch, 1998 – Nepal
 Oedothorax annulatus Wunderlich, 1974 – Nepal
 Oedothorax apicatus (Blackwall, 1850) – Palearctic
 Oedothorax assuetus Tanasevitch, 1998 – Nepal
 Oedothorax banksi Strand, 1906 – Alaska
 Oedothorax biantu Zhao & Li, 2014 − China 
 Oedothorax bifoveatus Tanasevitch, 2017 − Malaysia (Borneo), Indonesia (Java) 
 Oedothorax brevipalpus (Banks, 1901) – USA
 Oedothorax caporiaccoi Roewer, 1942 – Karakorum
 Oedothorax cascadeus Chamberlin, 1949 – USA
 Oedothorax clypeellum Tanasevitch, 1998 – Nepal
 Oedothorax collinus Ma & Zhu, 1991 – China
 Oedothorax convector Tanasevitch, 2014  − Thailand 
 Oedothorax cornutus Tanasevitch, 2015 − India 
 Oedothorax coronatus Tanasevitch, 1998 – Nepal
 Oedothorax cruciferoides Tanasevitch, 2020 – Nepal
 Oedothorax cunur Tanasevitch, 2015 −  India 
 Oedothorax dismodicoides Wunderlich, 1974 – Nepal
 Oedothorax elongatus Wunderlich, 1974 – Nepal
 Oedothorax esyunini Zhang, Zhang & Yu, 2003 – China
 Oedothorax falcifer Tanasevitch, 1998 – Nepal
 Oedothorax falciferoides Tanasevitch, 2015 −  India 
 Oedothorax fuscus (Blackwall, 1834) – Europe, Mallorca, North Africa, Azores, Russia
 Oedothorax gibbifer (Kulczynski, 1882) – Europe, Russia
 Oedothorax gibbosus (Blackwall, 1841) (type species) – Palearctic
 Oedothorax globiceps Thaler, 1987 – Kashmir
 Oedothorax hirsutus Wunderlich, 1974 – Nepal
 Oedothorax holmi Wunderlich, 1978 – East Africa
 Oedothorax howardi Petrunkevitch, 1925 – USA
 Oedothorax hulongensis Zhu & Wen, 1980 – Russia, China
 Oedothorax insulanus Paik, 1980 – Korea 
 Oedothorax japonicus Kishida, 1910 – Japan
 Oedothorax kathmandu Tanasevitch, 2020 – Nepal
 Oedothorax khasi Tanasevitch, 2017 – India
 Oedothorax kodaikanal Tanasevitch, 2015 −  India 
 Oedothorax latitibialis Bosmans, 1988 – Cameroon
 Oedothorax legrandi Jocque, 1985 – Comoro Islands
 Oedothorax limatus Crosby, 1905 – USA
 Oedothorax lineatus Wunderlich, 1974 – Nepal
 Oedothorax longiductus Bosmans, 1988 – Cameroon
 Oedothorax lopchu Tanasevitch, 2015 −  India 
 Oedothorax lucidus Wunderlich, 1974 – Nepal
 Oedothorax macrophthalmus Locket & Russell-Smith, 1980 – Nigeria, Ivory Coast
 Oedothorax malearmatus Tanasevitch, 1998 – Nepal
 Oedothorax mangsima Tanasevitch, 2020 – Nepal
 Oedothorax maximus (Emerton, 1882) – USA
 Oedothorax meghalaya Tanasevitch, 2015 − India 
 Oedothorax meridionalis Tanasevitch, 1987 – Iran, Central Asia
 Oedothorax modestus Tanasevitch, 1998 – Nepal
 Oedothorax mongolensis (Heimer, 1987) – Russia, Mongolia
 Oedothorax monoceros Miller, 1970 – Angola
 Oedothorax montifer (Emerton, 1882) – USA
 Oedothorax muscicola Bosmans, 1988 – Cameroon
 Oedothorax myanmar Tanasevitch, 2017 − Myanmar 
 Oedothorax nazareti Scharff, 1989 – Ethiopia
 Oedothorax paludigena Simon, 1926 – France, Corsica, Greece
 Oedothorax paracymbialis Tanasevitch, 2015 − India 
 Oedothorax paralegrandi Tanasevitch, 2016 − India (Himalaya) 
 Oedothorax pilosus Wunderlich, 1978 – Ethiopia
 Oedothorax retusus (Westring, 1851) – Palearctic
 Oedothorax rusticus Tanasevitch, 2015 − India
 Oedothorax savigniformis Tanasevitch, 1998 – Nepal
 Oedothorax seminolus Ivie & Barrows, 1935 – USA
 Oedothorax sexmaculatus Saito & Ono, 2001 – Japan
 Oedothorax sexoculatus Wunderlich, 1974 – Nepal
 Oedothorax sexoculorum Tanasevitch, 1998 – Nepal
 Oedothorax simplicithorax Tanasevitch, 1998 – Nepal
 Oedothorax sohra Tanasevitch, 2020 – India
 Oedothorax stylus Tanasevitch, 2015 − India 
 Oedothorax tholusus Tanasevitch, 1998 – Nepal
 Oedothorax tingitanus (Simon, 1884) – Spain, Morocco, Algeria, Tunisia
 Oedothorax triceps Tanasevitch, 2020 – Nepal
 Oedothorax trilineatus Saito, 1934 – Japan
 Oedothorax trilobatus (Banks, 1896) – USA, Canada, Russia
 Oedothorax unciger Tanasevitch, 2020 – India
 Oedothorax uncus Tanasevitch, 2015 − India 
 Oedothorax unicolor Wunderlich, 1974 – Nepal
 Oedothorax usitatus Jocque & Scharff, 1986 – Tanzania
 Oedothorax villosus Tanasevitch, 2015 − India

Oia
Oia Wunderlich, 1973
 Oia breviprocessia Song & Li, 2010 – China
 Oia imadatei (Oi, 1964) – Russia, Korea, Taiwan, Japan
 Oia kathmandu Tanasevitch, 2019 – Nepal
 Oia sororia Wunderlich, 1973 (type species) – India, Nepal

Oilinyphia
Oilinyphia Ono & Saito, 1989
 Oilinyphia hengji Zhao & Li, 2014 − China 
 Oilinyphia jadbounorum Ponksee & Tanikawa, 2010 – Thailand
 Oilinyphia peculiaris Ono & Saito, 1989 (type species) – Ryukyu Islands

Okhotigone
Okhotigone Eskov, 1993
 Okhotigone sounkyoensis (Saito, 1986) – Russia, China, Japan

Onychembolus
Onychembolus Millidge, 1985
 Onychembolus anceps Millidge, 1991 – Chile
 Onychembolus subalpinus Millidge, 1985 (type species) – Chile, Argentina

Ophrynia
Ophrynia Jocque, 1981
 Ophrynia galeata Jocque & Scharff, 1986 – Tanzania
 Ophrynia galeata lukwangulensis Jocque & Scharff, 1986 – Tanzania
 Ophrynia infecta Jocque & Scharff, 1986 – Tanzania
 Ophrynia insulana Scharff, 1990 – Tanzania
 Ophrynia juguma Scharff, 1990 – Tanzania
 Ophrynia perspicua Scharff, 1990 – Tanzania
 Ophrynia revelatrix Jocque & Scharff, 1986 – Tanzania
 Ophrynia rostrata Jocque & Scharff, 1986 – Tanzania
 Ophrynia summicola Jocque & Scharff, 1986 (type species) – Tanzania
 Ophrynia superciliosa Jocque, 1981 – Malawi
 Ophrynia trituberculata Bosmans, 1988 – Cameroon
 Ophrynia truncatula Scharff, 1990 – Tanzania
 Ophrynia uncata Jocque & Scharff, 1986 – Tanzania

Oreocyba
Oreocyba Holm, 1962
 Oreocyba elgonensis (Fage, 1936) (type species) – Kenya, Uganda
 Oreocyba propinqua Holm, 1962 – Kenya, Uganda

Oreoneta
Oreoneta Kulczynski, 1894
 Oreoneta alpina (Eskov, 1987) – Russia
 Oreoneta arctica (Holm, 1960) – Russia, Kurile Islands, Alaska
 Oreoneta banffkluane Saaristo & Marusik, 2004 – Canada
 Oreoneta beringiana Saaristo & Marusik, 2004 – Russia, Kurile Islands, Alaska, Canada
 Oreoneta brunnea (Emerton, 1882) – USA, Canada
 Oreoneta eskimopoint Saaristo & Marusik, 2004 – USA, Canada
 Oreoneta eskovi Saaristo & Marusik, 2004 – Russia, Kazakhstan
 Oreoneta fennica Saaristo & Marusik, 2004 – Finland
 Oreoneta fortyukon Saaristo & Marusik, 2004 – Alaska, Canada
 Oreoneta frigida (Thorell, 1872) (type species) – Greenland to Norway
 Oreoneta garrina (Chamberlin, 1949) – USA, Canada
 Oreoneta herschel Saaristo & Marusik, 2004 – Canada
 Oreoneta intercepta (O. P.-Cambridge, 1873) – Russia
 Oreoneta kurile Saaristo & Marusik, 2004 – Kurile Islands
 Oreoneta leviceps (L. Koch, 1879) – Russia, Alaska, Canada
 Oreoneta logunovi Saaristo & Marusik, 2004 – Russia
 Oreoneta magaputo Saaristo & Marusik, 2004 – Russia, Canada
 Oreoneta mineevi Saaristo & Marusik, 2004 – Russia
 Oreoneta mongolica (Wunderlich, 1995) – Mongolia
 Oreoneta montigena (L. Koch, 1872) – Switzerland to Slovakia
 Oreoneta punctata (Tullgren, 1955) – Sweden, Finland, Russia
 Oreoneta repeater Saaristo & Marusik, 2004 – Canada
 Oreoneta sepe Saaristo & Marusik, 2004 – Canada
 Oreoneta sinuosa (Tullgren, 1955) – Sweden, Finland, Russia
 Oreoneta tatrica (Kulczynski, 1915) – Central Europe
 Oreoneta tienshangensis Saaristo & Marusik, 2004 – Kazakhstan, China
 Oreoneta tuva Saaristo & Marusik, 2004 – Russia
 Oreoneta uralensis Saaristo & Marusik, 2004 – Russia
 Oreoneta vogelae Saaristo & Marusik, 2004 – USA
 Oreoneta wyomingia Saaristo & Marusik, 2004 – USA, Canada

Oreonetides
Oreonetides Strand, 1901
 Oreonetides badzhalensis Eskov, 1991 – Russia
 Oreonetides beattyi Paquin et al., 2009 – USA
 Oreonetides beringianus Eskov, 1991 – Russia
 Oreonetides filicatus (Crosby, 1937) – USA to Alaska
 Oreonetides flavescens (Crosby, 1937) – USA, Canada
 Oreonetides flavus (Emerton, 1915) – USA, Canada
 Oreonetides glacialis (L. Koch, 1872) – Europe
 Oreonetides helsdingeni Eskov, 1984 – Russia
 Oreonetides kolymensis Eskov, 1991 – Russia
 Oreonetides minimus Tanasevitch, 2017 – Russia (Far East)
 Oreonetides quadridentatus (Wunderlich, 1972) – Belgium, Germany, Austria
 Oreonetides rectangulatus (Emerton, 1913) – USA
 Oreonetides rotundus (Emerton, 1913) – USA, Canada
 Oreonetides sajanensis Eskov, 1991 – Russia
 Oreonetides shimizui (Yaginuma, 1972) – Russia, Japan
 Oreonetides taiwanus Tanasevitch, 2011 – Taiwan
 Oreonetides vaginatus (Thorell, 1872) (type species) – Holarctic

Oreophantes
Oreophantes Eskov, 1984
 Oreophantes recurvatus (Emerton, 1913) – USA, Canada

Orfeo
Orfeo Miller, 2007
 Orfeo desolatus (Keyserling, 1886) – Brazil
 Orfeo jobim Miller, 2007 (type species) – Brazil

Origanates
Origanates Crosby & Bishop, 1933
 Origanates rostratus (Emerton, 1882) – USA

Orsonwelles
Orsonwelles Hormiga, 2002
 Orsonwelles ambersonorum Hormiga, 2002 – Hawaii
 Orsonwelles arcanus Hormiga, 2002 – Hawaii
 Orsonwelles bellum Hormiga, 2002 – Hawaii
 Orsonwelles calx Hormiga, 2002 – Hawaii
 Orsonwelles falstaffius Hormiga, 2002 – Hawaii
 Orsonwelles graphicus (Simon, 1900) – Hawaii
 Orsonwelles iudicium Hormiga, 2002 – Hawaii
 Orsonwelles macbeth Hormiga, 2002 – Hawaii
 Orsonwelles malus Hormiga, 2002 – Hawaii
 Orsonwelles othello Hormiga, 2002 – Hawaii
 Orsonwelles polites Hormiga, 2002 (type species) – Hawaii
 Orsonwelles torosus (Simon, 1900) – Hawaii
 Orsonwelles ventus Hormiga, 2002 – Hawaii

Oryphantes
Oryphantes Hull, 1932
 Oryphantes aliquantulus Duperre & Paquin, 2007 – USA, Canada
 Oryphantes angulatus (O. P.-Cambridge, 1881) (type species) – Palearctic
 Oryphantes bipilis (Kulczynski, 1885) – Russia
 Oryphantes cognatus (Tanasevitch, 1992) – Russia
 Oryphantes geminus (Tanasevitch, 1982) – Russia, Kazakhstan

Ostearius
Ostearius Hull, 1911
 Ostearius melanopygius (O. P.-Cambridge, 1879) (type species) – Cosmopolitan
 Ostearius muticus Gao, Gao & Zhu, 1994 – China

Ouedia
Ouedia Bosmans & Abrous, 1992
 Ouedia rufithorax (Simon, 1881) – Portugal, France, Corsica, Italy, Algeria, Tunisia

Pachydelphus
Pachydelphus Jocque & Bosmans, 1983
 Pachydelphus africanus (Simon, 1894) – Gabon, Sierra Leone
 Pachydelphus banco Jocque & Bosmans, 1983 (type species) – Ivory Coast
 Pachydelphus coiffaiti Jocque, 1983 – Gabon
 Pachydelphus tonqui Jocque & Bosmans, 1983 – Ivory Coast

Pacifiphantes
Pacifiphantes Eskov & Marusik, 1994
 Pacifiphantes magnificus (Chamberlin & Ivie, 1943) – USA, Canada
 Pacifiphantes zakharovi Eskov & Marusik, 1994 (type species) – Russia, China

Paikiniana
Paikiniana Eskov, 1992
 Paikiniana bella (Paik, 1978) (type species) – Korea
 Paikiniana biceps Song & Li, 2008 – China
 Paikiniana furcata Zhao & Li, 2014 − China 
 Paikiniana iriei (Ono, 2007) – Japan
 Paikiniana keikoae (Saito, 1988) – Japan
 Paikiniana lurida (Seo, 1991) – Korea, Japan
 Paikiniana mikurana Ono, 2010 – Japan
 Paikiniana mira (Oi, 1960) – China, Korea, Japan
 Paikiniana operta Irfan & Peng, 2018 – China
 Paikiniana vulgaris (Oi, 1960) – Korea, Japan

Palaeohyphantes
Palaeohyphantes Millidge, 1984
 Palaeohyphantes simplicipalpis (Wunderlich, 1976) – New South Wales

Palliduphantes
Palliduphantes Saaristo & Tanasevitch, 2001
 Palliduphantes altus (Tanasevitch, 1986) – Central Asia
 Palliduphantes alutacius (Simon, 1884) – Europe
 Palliduphantes angustiformis (Simon, 1884) – Corsica, Sardinia
 Palliduphantes antroniensis (Schenkel, 1933) – Palearctic
 Palliduphantes arenicola (Denis, 1964) – France, Switzerland
 Palliduphantes baeumeri Wunderlich, 2020 – Canary Islands
 Palliduphantes banderolatus Barrientos, 2020 –  Morocco
 Palliduphantes bayrami Demir, Topçu & Seyyar, 2008 – Turkey
 Palliduphantes bigerrensis (Simon, 1929) – France
 Palliduphantes bolivari (Fage, 1931) – Portugal, Spain, Gibraltar
 Palliduphantes brignolii (Kratochvil, 1978) – Croatia
 Palliduphantes byzantinus (Fage, 1931) – Bulgaria, Greece, Turkey
 Palliduphantes cadiziensis (Wunderlich, 1980) – Portugal, Spain, Gibraltar, Morocco
 Palliduphantes carusoi (Brignoli, 1979) – Sicily
 Palliduphantes cebennicus (Simon, 1929) – France
 Palliduphantes ceretanus (Denis, 1962) – France
 Palliduphantes cernuus (Simon, 1884) – France, Spain
 Palliduphantes chenini Bosmans, 2003 – Tunisia
 Palliduphantes conradini (Brignoli, 1971) – Italy
 Palliduphantes constantinescui (Georgescu, 1989) – Romania
 Palliduphantes corfuensis (Wunderlich, 1995) – Greece
 Palliduphantes corsicos (Wunderlich, 1980) – Corsica
 Palliduphantes cortesi Ribera & De Mas, 2003 – Spain
 Palliduphantes culicinus (Simon, 1884) – France, Switzerland
 Palliduphantes curvus Tanasevitch, 2019 – Portugal, Spain
 Palliduphantes dentatidens (Simon, 1929) – France, Italy
 Palliduphantes elburz Tanasevitch, 2017 − Iran 
 Palliduphantes epaminondae (Brignoli, 1979) – Greece
 Palliduphantes ericaeus (Blackwall, 1853) – Europe, Russia
 Palliduphantes fagei (Machado, 1939) – Spain
 Palliduphantes fagicola (Simon, 1929) – France
 Palliduphantes florentinus (Caporiacco, 1947) – Italy
 Palliduphantes garganicus (Caporiacco, 1951) – Italy
 Palliduphantes gladiola (Simon, 1884) – France (incl. Corsica)
 Palliduphantes gypsi Ribera & De Mas, 2003 – Spain
 Palliduphantes insignis (O. P.-Cambridge, 1913) – Europe
 Palliduphantes intirmus (Tanasevitch, 1987) – Russia, Central Asia
 Palliduphantes istrianus (Kulczynski, 1914) – Eastern Europe
 Palliduphantes kalaensis (Bosmans, 1985) – Algeria
 Palliduphantes khobarum (Charitonov, 1947) – Greece, Turkey, Russia, Central Asia
 Palliduphantes labilis (Simon, 1913) – Algeria, Tunisia
 Palliduphantes ligulifer (Denis, 1952) – Romania
 Palliduphantes liguricus (Simon, 1929) – Europe
 Palliduphantes longiscapus (Wunderlich, 1987) – Canary Islands
 Palliduphantes longiseta (Simon, 1884) – Corsica, Italy
 Palliduphantes lorifer (Simon, 1907) – Spain
 Palliduphantes malickyi (Wunderlich, 1980) – Crete
 Palliduphantes margaritae (Denis, 1934) – France
 Palliduphantes megascapus Barrientos, 2020 – Morocco
 Palliduphantes melitensis (Bosmans, 1994) – Malta
 Palliduphantes milleri (Starega, 1972) – Poland, Slovakia, Romania, Ukraine
 Palliduphantes minimus (Deeleman-Reinhold, 1985) – Cyprus
 Palliduphantes montanus (Kulczynski, 1898) – Germany, Austria, Italy, Turkey
 Palliduphantes oredonensis (Denis, 1950) – France
 Palliduphantes pallidus (O. P.-Cambridge, 1871) (type species) – Palearctic
 Palliduphantes palmensis (Wunderlich, 1992) – Canary Islands
 Palliduphantes pillichi (Kulczynski, 1915) – Central Europe
 Palliduphantes rubens (Wunderlich, 1987) – Canary Islands
 Palliduphantes salfii (Dresco, 1949) – Italy
 Palliduphantes sanctivincenti (Simon, 1872) – France
 Palliduphantes sbordonii (Brignoli, 1970) – Iran
 Palliduphantes schmitzi (Kulczynski, 1899) – Madeira, Azores
 Palliduphantes solivagus (Tanasevitch, 1986) – Kyrgyzstan
 Palliduphantes spelaeorum (Kulczynski, 1914) – Balkans, Bulgaria, Greece
 Palliduphantes stygius (Simon, 1884) – Portugal, Spain, France, Azores
 Palliduphantes tenerifensis (Wunderlich, 1992) – Canary Islands
 Palliduphantes theosophicus (Tanasevitch, 1987) – Nepal
 Palliduphantes tricuspis Bosmans, 2006 – Algeria
 Palliduphantes trnovensis (Drensky, 1931) – Serbia, Macedonia, Bulgaria
 Palliduphantes vadelli Lissner, 2016 − Spain (Majorca) 
 Palliduphantes yakourensis Bosmans, 2006 – Algeria
 Palliduphantes zaragozai (Ribera, 1981) – Spain

Panamomops
Panamomops Simon, 1884
 Panamomops affinis Miller & Kratochvil, 1939 – Switzerland, Germany, Austria, Czech Republic, Slovakia
 Panamomops depilis Eskov & Marusik, 1994 – Russia, Kazakhstan
 Panamomops dybowskii (O. P.-Cambridge, 1873) – Russia
 Panamomops fagei Miller & Kratochvil, 1939 – Europe
 Panamomops fedotovi (Charitonov, 1937) – Ukraine, Georgia, Armenia
 Panamomops inconspicuus (Miller & Valesova, 1964) – Europe
 Panamomops latifrons Miller, 1959 – Czech Republic, Slovakia, Austria, Balkans
 Panamomops mengei Simon, 1926 – Palearctic
 Panamomops mutilus (Denis, 1962) – Spain, France
 Panamomops palmgreni Thaler, 1973 – Germany, Switzerland, Austria, Slovakia
 Panamomops pamiricus Tanasevitch, 1989 – Kyrgyzstan
 Panamomops sulcifrons (Wider, 1834) (type species) – Europe, Russia
 Panamomops tauricornis (Simon, 1881) – Palearctic

Paracornicularia
Paracornicularia Crosby & Bishop, 1931
 Paracornicularia bicapillata Crosby & Bishop, 1931 – USA

Paracymboides
Paracymboides Tanasevitch, 2011
 Paracymboides aduncus Tanasevitch, 2011 – India
 Paracymboides tibialis Tanasevitch, 2011 (type species) – India

Paraeboria
Paraeboria Eskov, 1990
 Paraeboria jeniseica (Eskov, 1981) – Russia

Parafroneta
Parafroneta Blest, 1979
 Parafroneta ambigua Blest, 1979 – New Zealand
 Parafroneta confusa Blest, 1979 – New Zealand
 Parafroneta demota Blest & Vink, 2002 – New Zealand
 Parafroneta haurokoae Blest & Vink, 2002 – New Zealand
 Parafroneta hirsuta Blest & Vink, 2003 – New Zealand
 Parafroneta insula Blest, 1979 – New Zealand
 Parafroneta marrineri (Hogg, 1909) (type species) – Campbell Islands
 Parafroneta minuta Blest, 1979 – New Zealand
 Parafroneta monticola Blest, 1979 – New Zealand
 Parafroneta persimilis Blest, 1979 – New Zealand
 Parafroneta pilosa Blest & Vink, 2003 – New Zealand
 Parafroneta subalpina Blest & Vink, 2002 – New Zealand
 Parafroneta subantarctica Blest, 1979 – New Zealand
 Parafroneta westlandica Blest & Vink, 2002 – New Zealand

Paraglyphesis
Paraglyphesis Eskov, 1991
 Paraglyphesis lasiargoides Eskov, 1991 – Russia
 Paraglyphesis monticola Eskov, 1991 – Russia
 Paraglyphesis polaris Eskov, 1991 (type species) – Russia

Paragongylidiellum
Paragongylidiellum Wunderlich, 1973
 Paragongylidiellum caliginosum Wunderlich, 1973 – India, Nepal

Paraletes
Paraletes Millidge, 1991
 Paraletes pogo Miller, 2007 – Peru
 Paraletes timidus Millidge, 1991 (type species) – Brazil

Parameioneta
Parameioneta Locket, 1982
 Parameioneta bilobata Li & Zhu, 1993 – China, Vietnam
 Parameioneta bishou Zhao & Li, 2014  − China, Thailand
 Parameioneta javaensis Tanasevitch, 2020  − Java
 Parameioneta multifida Zhao & Li, 2014 − China 
 Parameioneta spicata Locket, 1982 (type species) – Malaysia
 Parameioneta sulawesi (Tanasevitch, 2012) (type species) – Sulawesi
 Parameioneta tricolorata Zhao & Li, 2014 − China 
 Parameioneta yongjing Yin, 2012 – China

Parapelecopsis
Parapelecopsis Wunderlich, 1992
 Parapelecopsis conimbricensis Bosmans & Crespo, 2010 – Portugal
 Parapelecopsis mediocris (Kulczynski, 1899) – Madeira
 Parapelecopsis nemoralioides (O. P.-Cambridge, 1884) – Europe
 Parapelecopsis nemoralis (Blackwall, 1841) (type species) – Europe, Russia

Parasisis
Parasisis Eskov, 1984
 Parasisis amurensis Eskov, 1984 – Russia, China, Korea, Japan

Paratapinocyba
Paratapinocyba Saito, 1986
 Paratapinocyba kumadai Saito, 1986 (type species) – Japan
 Paratapinocyba oiwa (Saito, 1980) – Japan

Paratmeticus
Paratmeticus Marusik & Koponen, 2010
 Paratmeticus bipunctis (Bösenberg & Strand, 1906) – Russia, Sakhalin, Japan

Parawubanoides
Parawubanoides Eskov & Marusik, 1992
 Parawubanoides unicornis (O. P.-Cambridge, 1873) – Russia, Mongolia

Parhypomma
Parhypomma Eskov, 1992
 Parhypomma naraense (Oi, 1960) – Japan

Paro
Paro Berland, 1942
 Paro simoni Berland, 1942 – Rapa

Parvunaria
Parvunaria Tanasevitch, 2018
 Parvunaria birma Tanasevitch, 2018 – Myanmar

Patagoneta
Patagoneta Millidge, 1985
 Patagoneta antarctica (Tullgren, 1901) – Chile

Pecado
Pecado Hormiga & Scharff, 2005
 Pecado impudicus (Denis, 1945) – Spain, Morocco, Algeria

Pelecopsidis
Pelecopsidis Bishop & Crosby, 1935
 Pelecopsidis frontalis (Banks, 1904) – USA

Pelecopsis
Pelecopsis Simon, 1864
 Pelecopsis agaetensis Wunderlich, 1987 – Canary Islands
 Pelecopsis albifrons Holm, 1979 – Kenya
 Pelecopsis alpica Thaler, 1991 – Switzerland, Austria, Italy
 Pelecopsis alticola (Berland, 1936) – Kenya
 Pelecopsis alticola elgonensis (Holm, 1962) – Uganda
 Pelecopsis alticola kenyensis (Holm, 1962) – Kenya
 Pelecopsis alticola kivuensis (Miller, 1970) – Congo
 Pelecopsis amabilis (Simon, 1884) – Algeria
 Pelecopsis aureipes Denis, 1962 – Morocco
 Pelecopsis biceps (Holm, 1962) – Tanzania
 Pelecopsis bicornuta Hillyard, 1980 – Spain, Morocco
 Pelecopsis bishopi Kaston, 1945 – USA
 Pelecopsis bucephala (O. P.-Cambridge, 1875) – Western Mediterranean
 Pelecopsis capitata (Simon, 1884) – France
 Pelecopsis cedricola Bosmans & Abrous, 1992 – Algeria
 Pelecopsis coccinea (O. P.-Cambridge, 1875) – Spain, Morocco
 Pelecopsis crassipes Tanasevitch, 1987 – Russia, Central Asia
 Pelecopsis denisi Brignoli, 1983 – Andorra, France
 Pelecopsis digitulus Bosmans & Abrous, 1992 – Algeria
 Pelecopsis dorniana Heimer, 1987 – Russia, Mongolia
 Pelecopsis elongata (Wider, 1834) (type species) – Europe, Russia, Israel
 Pelecopsis eminula (Simon, 1884) – France, Italy
 Pelecopsis flava Holm, 1962 – Uganda, Congo
 Pelecopsis fornicata Miller, 1970 – Congo
 Pelecopsis fulva Holm, 1962 – Uganda
 Pelecopsis hamata Bosmans, 1988 – Cameroon
 Pelecopsis hipporegia (Denis, 1968) – Algeria, Tunisia
 Pelecopsis humiliceps Holm, 1979 – Kenya, Uganda
 Pelecopsis indus Tanasevitch, 2011 – India, Pakistan
 Pelecopsis inedita (O. P.-Cambridge, 1875) – Mediterranean
 Pelecopsis infusca Holm, 1962 – Uganda
 Pelecopsis intricata Jocque, 1984 – South Africa
 Pelecopsis janus Jocque, 1984 – South Africa
 Pelecopsis kabyliana Bosmans & Abrous, 1992 – Algeria
 Pelecopsis kalaensis Bosmans & Abrous, 1992 – Algeria
 Pelecopsis laptevi Tanasevitch & Fet, 1986 – Ukraine, Iran, Central Asia
 Pelecopsis leonina (Simon, 1884) – Algeria
 Pelecopsis levantensis Tanasevitch, 2016 − Israel 
 Pelecopsis litoralis Wunderlich, 1987 – Canary Islands
 Pelecopsis loksai Szinetar & Samu, 2003 – Hungary
 Pelecopsis lunaris Bosmans & Abrous, 1992 – Algeria
 Pelecopsis major (Denis, 1945) – Algeria
 Pelecopsis malawiensis Jocque, 1977 – Malawi
 Pelecopsis margaretae Georgescu, 1975 – Romania
 Pelecopsis medusoides Jocque, 1984 – South Africa
 Pelecopsis mengei (Simon, 1884) – Holarctic
 Pelecopsis minor Wunderlich, 1995 – Mongolia
 Pelecopsis modica Hillyard, 1980 – Spain, Morocco
 Pelecopsis moesta (Banks, 1892) – USA
 Pelecopsis monsantensis Bosmans & Crespo, 2010 – Portugal
 Pelecopsis moschensis (Caporiacco, 1947) – Tanzania
 Pelecopsis mutica Denis, 1957 – France
 Pelecopsis nigriceps Holm, 1962 – Kenya, Uganda
 Pelecopsis nigroloba Fei, Gao & Zhu, 1995 – Russia, China
 Pelecopsis odontophora (Kulczynski, 1895) – Georgia
 Pelecopsis oranensis (Simon, 1884) – Morocco, Algeria
 Pelecopsis oujda Bosmans & Abrous, 1992 – Morocco
 Pelecopsis palmgreni Marusik & Esyunin, 1998 – Russia, Kazakhstan
 Pelecopsis papillii Scharff, 1990 – Tanzania
 Pelecopsis parallela (Wider, 1834) – Palearctic
 Pelecopsis paralleloides Tanasevitch & Fet, 1986 – Central Asia
 Pelecopsis partita Denis, 1953 – France
 Pelecopsis parvicollis Wunderlich, 1995 – Mongolia
 Pelecopsis parvioculis Miller, 1970 – Angola
 Pelecopsis pasteuri (Berland, 1936) – Tanzania
 Pelecopsis pavida (O. P.-Cambridge, 1872) – Greece, Israel
 Pelecopsis physeter (Fage, 1936) – Congo, Rwanda, Kenya, Tanzania
 Pelecopsis pooti Bosmans & Jocque, 1993 – Spain
 Pelecopsis proclinata Bosmans, 1988 – Cameroon
 Pelecopsis punctilineata Holm, 1964 – Congo, Rwanda
 Pelecopsis punctiseriata (Bösenberg & Strand, 1906) – Japan
 Pelecopsis radicicola (L. Koch, 1872) – Palearctic
 Pelecopsis reclinata (Holm, 1962) – Kenya, Uganda
 Pelecopsis riffensis Bosmans & Abrous, 1992 – Morocco
 Pelecopsis robusta Weiss, 1990 – Romania
 Pelecopsis ruwenzoriensis (Holm, 1962) – Uganda
 Pelecopsis sanje Scharff, 1990 – Tanzania
 Pelecopsis sculpta (Emerton, 1917) – Canada
 Pelecopsis sculpta digna Chamberlin & Ivie, 1939 – USA
 Pelecopsis senecicola Holm, 1962 – Uganda
 Pelecopsis subflava Russell-Smith & Jocque, 1986 – Kenya
 Pelecopsis suilla (Simon, 1884) – Algeria
 Pelecopsis susannae (Simon, 1914) – Portugal, France
 Pelecopsis tenuipalpis Holm, 1979 – Uganda
 Pelecopsis tybaertielloides Jocque, 1984 – Kenya
 Pelecopsis unimaculata (Banks, 1892) – USA
 Pelecopsis varians (Holm, 1962) – Kenya, Uganda

Peponocranium
Peponocranium Simon, 1884
 Peponocranium dubium Wunderlich, 1995 – Mongolia
 Peponocranium ludicrum (O. P.-Cambridge, 1861) (type species) – Europe, Russia
 Peponocranium orbiculatum (O. P.-Cambridge, 1882) – Germany to Russia, Georgia
 Peponocranium praeceps Miller, 1943 – Finland, Germany, to Russia, Ukraine
 Peponocranium simile Tullgren, 1955 – Sweden

Perlongipalpus
Perlongipalpus Eskov & Marusik, 1991
 Perlongipalpus mannilai Eskov & Marusik, 1991 – Russia
 Perlongipalpus mongolicus Marusik & Koponen, 2008 – Mongolia
 Perlongipalpus pinipumilis Eskov & Marusik, 1991 (type species) – Russia
 Perlongipalpus saaristoi Marusik & Koponen, 2008 – Russia

Perregrinus
Perregrinus Tanasevitch, 1992
 Perregrinus deformis (Tanasevitch, 1982) – Russia, Mongolia, China, Canada

Perro
Perro Tanasevitch, 1992
 Perro camtschadalica (Kulczynski, 1885) – Russia
 Perro polaris (Eskov, 1986) – Russia, Canada
 Perro putoranica (Eskov, 1986) – Russia
 Perro subtilipes (Tanasevitch, 1985) (type species) – Russia
 Perro tshuktshorum (Eskov & Marusik, 1991) – Russia

Phanetta
Phanetta Keyserling, 1886
 Phanetta subterranea (Emerton, 1875) – USA

Phlattothrata
Phlattothrata Crosby & Bishop, 1933
 Phlattothrata flagellata (Emerton, 1911) (type species) – USA
 Phlattothrata parva (Kulczynski, 1926) – Holarctic

Phyllarachne
Phyllarachne Millidge & Russell-Smith, 1992
 Phyllarachne levicula Millidge & Russell-Smith, 1992 – Borneo

Piesocalus
Piesocalus Simon, 1894
 Piesocalus javanus Simon, 1894 – Java

Piniphantes
Piniphantes Saaristo & Tanasevitch, 1996
 Piniphantes agnellus (Maurer & Thaler, 1988) – France, Italy
 Piniphantes cinereus (Tanasevitch, 1986) – Kyrgyzstan
 Piniphantes cirratus (Thaler, 1986) – Corsica
 Piniphantes himalayensis (Tanasevitch, 1987) – Nepal, Pakistan
 Piniphantes macer (Tanasevitch, 1986) – Kyrgyzstan
 Piniphantes pinicola (Simon, 1884) (type species) – Palearctic
 Piniphantes plumatus (Tanasevitch, 1986) – Kyrgyzstan
 Piniphantes uzbekistanicus (Tanasevitch, 1983) – Uzbekistan, Kyrgyzstan
 Piniphantes zonsteini (Tanasevitch, 1989) – Uzbekistan, Kyrgyzstan

Pityohyphantes
Pityohyphantes Simon, 1929
 Pityohyphantes alticeps Chamberlin & Ivie, 1943 – USA
 Pityohyphantes brachygynus Chamberlin & Ivie, 1942 – USA
 Pityohyphantes costatus (Hentz, 1850) – USA
 Pityohyphantes costatus annulipes (Banks, 1892) – North America
 Pityohyphantes cristatus Chamberlin & Ivie, 1942 – USA
 Pityohyphantes cristatus coloradensis Chamberlin & Ivie, 1942 – USA
 Pityohyphantes hesperus (Chamberlin, 1920) – USA
 Pityohyphantes kamela Chamberlin & Ivie, 1943 – USA
 Pityohyphantes limitaneus (Emerton, 1915) – USA, Canada
 Pityohyphantes lomondensis Chamberlin & Ivie, 1941 – USA
 Pityohyphantes minidoka Chamberlin & Ivie, 1943 – USA
 Pityohyphantes navajo Chamberlin & Ivie, 1942 – USA
 Pityohyphantes palilis (L. Koch, 1870) – Central, Eastern Europe
 Pityohyphantes pallidus Chamberlin & Ivie, 1942 – USA
 Pityohyphantes phrygianus (C. L. Koch, 1836) (type species) – Palearctic
 Pityohyphantes rubrofasciatus (Keyserling, 1886) – USA, Canada
 Pityohyphantes subarcticus Chamberlin & Ivie, 1943 – Canada, Alaska
 Pityohyphantes tacoma Chamberlin & Ivie, 1942 – USA

Plaesianillus
Plaesianillus Simon, 1926
 Plaesianillus cyclops (Simon, 1881) – France

Platyspira
Platyspira Song & Li, 2009
 Platyspira tanasevitchi Song & Li, 2009 – China

Plectembolus
Plectembolus Millidge & Russell-Smith, 1992
 Plectembolus biflectus Millidge & Russell-Smith, 1992 – Philippines
 Plectembolus quadriflectus Millidge & Russell-Smith, 1992 (type species) – Sumatra
 Plectembolus quinqueflectus Millidge & Russell-Smith, 1992 – Sumatra
 Plectembolus similis Millidge & Russell-Smith, 1992 – Sumatra
 Plectembolus triflectus Millidge & Russell-Smith, 1992 – Malaysia

Plesiophantes
Plesiophantes Heimer, 1981
 Plesiophantes joosti Heimer, 1981 (type species) – Russia, Georgia, Turkey
 Plesiophantes simplex Tanasevitch, 1987 – Georgia
 Plesiophantes tanasevitchi Wunderlich, 2011 – Russia

Plicatiductus
Plicatiductus Millidge & Russell-Smith, 1992
 Plicatiductus storki Millidge & Russell-Smith, 1992 – Sulawesi

Pocadicnemis
Pocadicnemis Simon, 1884
 Pocadicnemis americana Millidge, 1976 – USA, Canada, Greenland
 Pocadicnemis carpatica (Chyzer, 1894) – Central, Eastern Europe
 Pocadicnemis desioi Caporiacco, 1935 – Karakorum
 Pocadicnemis jacksoni Millidge, 1976 – Portugal, Spain, France, China
 Pocadicnemis juncea Locket & Millidge, 1953 – Palearctic
 Pocadicnemis occidentalis Millidge, 1976 – USA
 Pocadicnemis pumila (Blackwall, 1841) (type species) – Holarctic

Pocobletus
Pocobletus Simon, 1894
 Pocobletus bivittatus Simon, 1897 – St. Vincent
 Pocobletus coroniger Simon, 1894 (type species) – Costa Rica to Venezuela

Poecilafroneta
Poecilafroneta Blest, 1979
 Poecilafroneta caudata Blest, 1979 – New Zealand

Poeciloneta
Poeciloneta Kulczynski, 1894
 Poeciloneta ancora Zhai & Zhu, 2008 – China
 Poeciloneta bellona Chamberlin & Ivie, 1943 – USA
 Poeciloneta bihamata (Emerton, 1882) – USA
 Poeciloneta calcaratus (Emerton, 1909) – Alaska, Canada, USA
 Poeciloneta canionis Chamberlin & Ivie, 1943 – USA
 Poeciloneta fructuosa (Keyserling, 1886) – USA
 Poeciloneta lyrica (Zorsch, 1937) – North America
 Poeciloneta pallida Kulczynski, 1908 – Russia
 Poeciloneta petrophila Tanasevitch, 1989 – Russia, Canada
 Poeciloneta tanasevitchi Marusik, 1991 – Russia
 Poeciloneta theridiformis (Emerton, 1911) – Russia, North America
 Poeciloneta vakkhanka Tanasevitch, 1989 – Russia
 Poeciloneta variegata (Blackwall, 1841) (type species) – Holarctic
 Poeciloneta xizangensis Zhai & Zhu, 2008 – China

Porrhomma
Porrhomma Simon, 1884
 Porrhomma altaica Růžička, 2018 – Altai (Russia, Kazakhstan)
 Porrhomma boreale (Banks, 1899) – Russia, Mongolia, Alaska
 Porrhomma borgesi Wunderlich, 2008 – Azores
 Porrhomma cambridgei Merrett, 1994 – Europe
 Porrhomma campbelli F. O. P.-Cambridge, 1894 – Palearctic
 Porrhomma cavernicola (Keyserling, 1886) – USA
 Porrhomma convexum (Westring, 1851) (type species) – Holarctic
 Porrhomma egeria Simon, 1884 – Europe, Russia
 Porrhomma errans (Blackwall, 1841) – Palearctic
 Porrhomma gertschi Hackman, 1954 – Canada
 Porrhomma indecorum Simon, 1910 – Algeria
 Porrhomma longjiangense Zhu & Wang, 1983 – Russia, China
 Porrhomma macrochelis (Emerton, 1917) – Canada, Alaska
 Porrhomma magnum Tanasevitch, 2012 – Russia
 Porrhomma microcavense Wunderlich, 1990 – Europe, Russia
 Porrhomma microphthalmum (O. P.-Cambridge, 1871) – Palearctic
 Porrhomma microps (Roewer, 1931) – Europe to Azerbaijan
 Porrhomma montanum Jackson, 1913 – Palearctic
 Porrhomma myops Simon, 1884 – Europe
 Porrhomma oblitum (O. P.-Cambridge, 1871) – Europe
 Porrhomma ohkawai Saito, 1977 – Japan
 Porrhomma pallidum Jackson, 1913 – Palearctic
 Porrhomma pallidum affinis Miller & Kratochvil, 1940 – Slovakia
 Porrhomma profundum Dahl, 1939 – Eastern Europe
 Porrhomma pygmaeum (Blackwall, 1834) – Palearctic
 Porrhomma rakanum Yaginuma & Saito, 1981 – Japan
 Porrhomma rosenhaueri (L. Koch, 1872) – Europe, Russia
 Porrhomma terrestre (Emerton, 1882) – USA

Praestigia
Praestigia Millidge, 1954
 Praestigia duffeyi Millidge, 1954 (type species) – Europe
 Praestigia eskovi Marusik, Gnelitsa & Koponen, 2008 – Russia
 Praestigia groenlandica Holm, 1967 – Canada, Greenland
 Praestigia kulczynskii Eskov, 1979 – Russia, Japan, Canada
 Praestigia makarovae Marusik, Gnelitsa & Koponen, 2008 – Russia
 Praestigia pini (Holm, 1950) – Sweden, Finland, Russia, Mongolia
 Praestigia sibirica Marusik, Gnelitsa & Koponen, 2008 – Russia, Alaska
 Praestigia uralensis Marusik, Gnelitsa & Koponen, 2008 – Russia

Primerigonina
Primerigonina Wunderlich, 1995
 Primerigonina australis Wunderlich, 1995 – Panama

Prinerigone
Prinerigone Millidge, 1988
 Prinerigone aethiopica (Tullgren, 1910) – Cameroon, Kenya, Tanzania
 Prinerigone pigra (Blackwall, 1862) – Madeira
 Prinerigone vagans (Audouin, 1826) (type species) – Old World
 Prinerigone vagans arabica (Jocque, 1981) – Saudi Arabia

Priperia
Priperia Simon, 1904
 Priperia bicolor Simon, 1904 – Hawaii

Procerocymbium
Procerocymbium Eskov, 1989
 Procerocymbium buryaticum Marusik & Koponen, 2001 – Russia
 Procerocymbium dondalei Marusik & Koponen, 2001 – Canada
 Procerocymbium jeniseicum Marusik & Koponen, 2001 – Russia
 Procerocymbium sibiricum Eskov, 1989 (type species) – Russia

Proelauna
Proelauna Jocque, 1981
 Proelauna humicola (Miller, 1970) – Angola, Tanzania, Malawi

Proislandiana
Proislandiana Tanasevitch, 1985
 Proislandiana berroni Dimitrov, 2020 – Turkey, Armenia
 Proislandiana pallida (Kulczynski, 1908) – Russia

Promynoglenes
Promynoglenes Blest, 1979
 Promynoglenes grandis Blest, 1979 – New Zealand
 Promynoglenes minuscula Blest & Vink, 2003 – New Zealand
 Promynoglenes minuta Blest & Vink, 2002 – New Zealand
 Promynoglenes nobilis Blest, 1979 (type species) – New Zealand
 Promynoglenes parvula Blest, 1979 – New Zealand
 Promynoglenes silvestris Blest, 1979 – New Zealand

Pronasoona
Pronasoona Millidge, 1995
 Pronasoona aurata Millidge, 1995 – Thailand
 Pronasoona sylvatica Millidge, 1995 (type species) – Borneo

Prosoponoides
Prosoponoides Millidge & Russell-Smith, 1992
 Prosoponoides hamatum Millidge & Russell-Smith, 1992 (type species) – Sumatra
 Prosoponoides jambi Tanasevitch, 2017 −  Indonesia (Sumatra) 
 Prosoponoides kaharianum Millidge & Russell-Smith, 1992 – Borneo
 Prosoponoides simile Millidge & Russell-Smith, 1992 – Thailand
 Prosoponoides sinense (Chen, 1991) – China, Vietnam
 Prosoponoides youyiensis Liu & J. Chen, 2020 – China

Protoerigone
Protoerigone Blest, 1979
 Protoerigone obtusa Blest, 1979 – New Zealand
 Protoerigone otagoa Blest, 1979 (type species) – New Zealand

Pseudafroneta
Pseudafroneta Blest, 1979
 Pseudafroneta frigida Blest, 1979 – New Zealand
 Pseudafroneta incerta (Bryant, 1935) (type species) – New Zealand
 Pseudafroneta lineata Blest, 1979 – New Zealand
 Pseudafroneta maxima Blest, 1979 – New Zealand
 Pseudafroneta pallida Blest, 1979 – New Zealand
 Pseudafroneta perplexa Blest, 1979 – New Zealand
 Pseudafroneta prominula Blest, 1979 – New Zealand

Pseudocarorita
Pseudocarorita Wunderlich, 1980
 Pseudocarorita thaleri (Saaristo, 1971) – Europe

Pseudocyba
Pseudocyba Tanasevitch, 1984
 Pseudocyba miracula Tanasevitch, 1984 – Russia, Kazakhstan

Pseudohilaira
Pseudohilaira Eskov, 1990
 Pseudohilaira mirabilis Eskov, 1990 – Russia

Pseudomaro
Pseudomaro Denis, 1966
 Pseudomaro aenigmaticus Denis, 1966 – Palearctic

Pseudomaso
Pseudomaso Locket & Russell-Smith, 1980
 Pseudomaso longipes Locket & Russell-Smith, 1980 – Nigeria

Pseudomicrargus
Pseudomicrargus Eskov, 1992
 Pseudomicrargus acuitegulatus (Oi, 1960) (type species) – Japan
 Pseudomicrargus asakawaensis (Oi, 1964) – Japan
 Pseudomicrargus latitegulatus (Oi, 1960) – Japan

Pseudomicrocentria
Pseudomicrocentria Miller, 1970
 Pseudomicrocentria minutissima Miller, 1970 (type species) – West, Central, South Africa
 Pseudomicrocentria simplex Locket, 1982 – Malaysia
 Pseudomicrocentria uncata Tanasevitch, 2020 – Borneo

Pseudoporrhomma
Pseudoporrhomma Eskov, 1993
 Pseudoporrhomma maritimum Eskov, 1993 – Russia

Pseudotyphistes
Pseudotyphistes Brignoli, 1972
 Pseudotyphistes biriva Rodrigues & Ott, 2007 – Brazil
 Pseudotyphistes cambara (Ott & Lise, 1997) – Brazil
 Pseudotyphistes cristatus (Ott & Lise, 1997) – Brazil
 Pseudotyphistes ludibundus (Keyserling, 1886) – Peru
 Pseudotyphistes pallidus (Millidge, 1991) – Argentina
 Pseudotyphistes pennatus Brignoli, 1972 (type species) – Uruguay
 Pseudotyphistes vulpiscaudatus (Ott & Lise, 1997) – Brazil

Pseudowubana
Pseudowubana Eskov & Marusik, 1992
 Pseudowubana wagae (O. P.-Cambridge, 1873) – Russia, Mongolia

Psilocymbium
Psilocymbium Millidge, 1991
 Psilocymbium acanthodes Miller, 2007 – Argentina
 Psilocymbium antonina Rodrigues & Ott, 2010 – Brazil
 Psilocymbium defloccatum (Keyserling, 1886) – Peru
 Psilocymbium incertum Millidge, 1991 – Colombia
 Psilocymbium lineatum (Millidge, 1991) – Brazil
 Psilocymbium pilifrons Millidge, 1991 – Colombia
 Psilocymbium tuberosum Millidge, 1991 (type species) – Brazil

See also
List of Linyphiidae species (A–H)
List of Linyphiidae species (Q–Z)

References

Linyphiidae